= The Letters of Vincent van Gogh =

Collection of papers by Vincent van Gogh

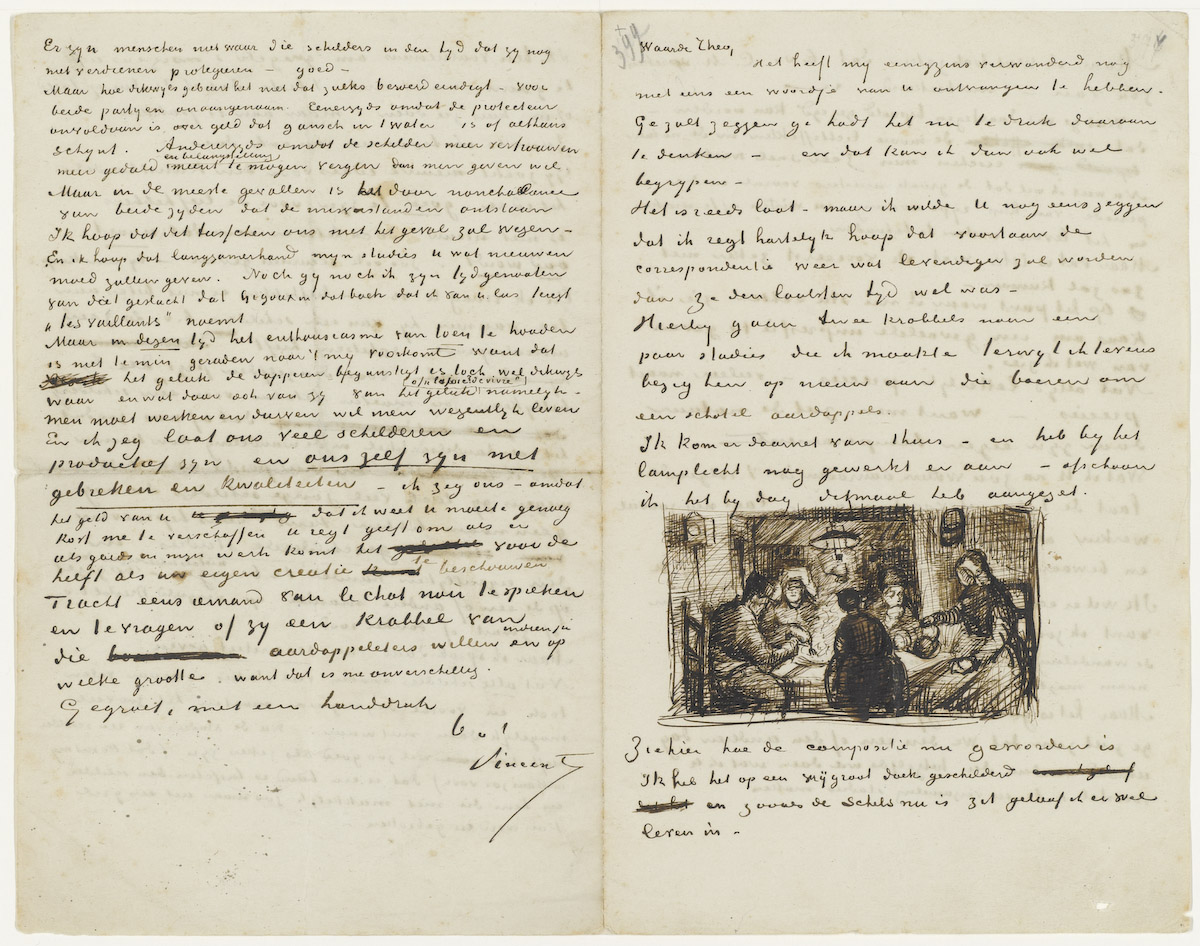
In April 1885, Vincent wrote to his brother about his first masterpiece, The Potato Eaters. He was currently working on the painting, which was to become one of his first complex compositions with multiple figures, and illustrated the letter with a sketch of the work, writing "See, this is what the composition has now become. I've painted it on a fairly large canvas, and as the sketch is now, I believe there's life in it."

The Letters of Vincent van Gogh is a collection of 903 surviving letters written (820) or received (83) by Vincent van Gogh. More than 650 of these were from Vincent to his brother Theo. The collection also includes letters Van Gogh wrote to his sister Wil and other relatives, as well as between artists such as Paul Gauguin, Anthon van Rappard, and Émile Bernard.

Johanna van Gogh-Bonger, the wife of Vincent's brother Theo, spent many years after her husband's death in 1891 compiling the letters, which were first published in 1914. Arnold Pomerans, editor of a 1966 selection of the letters, wrote that Theo "was the kind of man who saved even the smallest scrap of paper", and it is to this trait that the public owes the 663 letters from Vincent.

By contrast, Vincent infrequently kept letters sent to him and just 84 have survived, of which 39 were from Theo. Nevertheless, it is to these letters between the brothers that is owed much of what is known today about Vincent van Gogh. The only two periods about which the public is relatively uninformed are the Parisian period, during which they shared an apartment and had no need to correspond, and a one-year gap in the correspondence from 1879 to 1880, when they had temporarily fallen out over Vincent's career choice.

The letters effectively play much the same role in shedding light on the art of the period as those between the de Goncourt brothers do for literature.

== Background and publication history ==
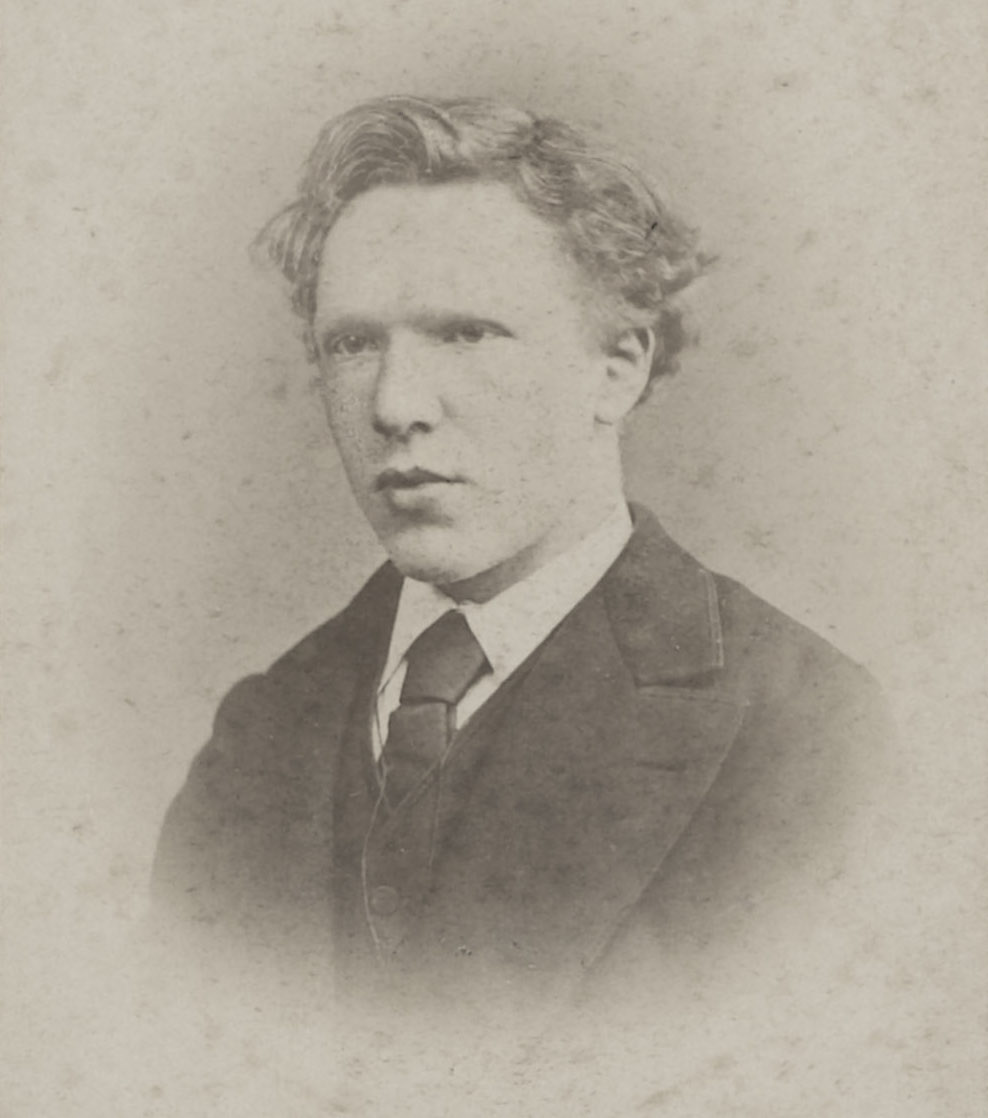
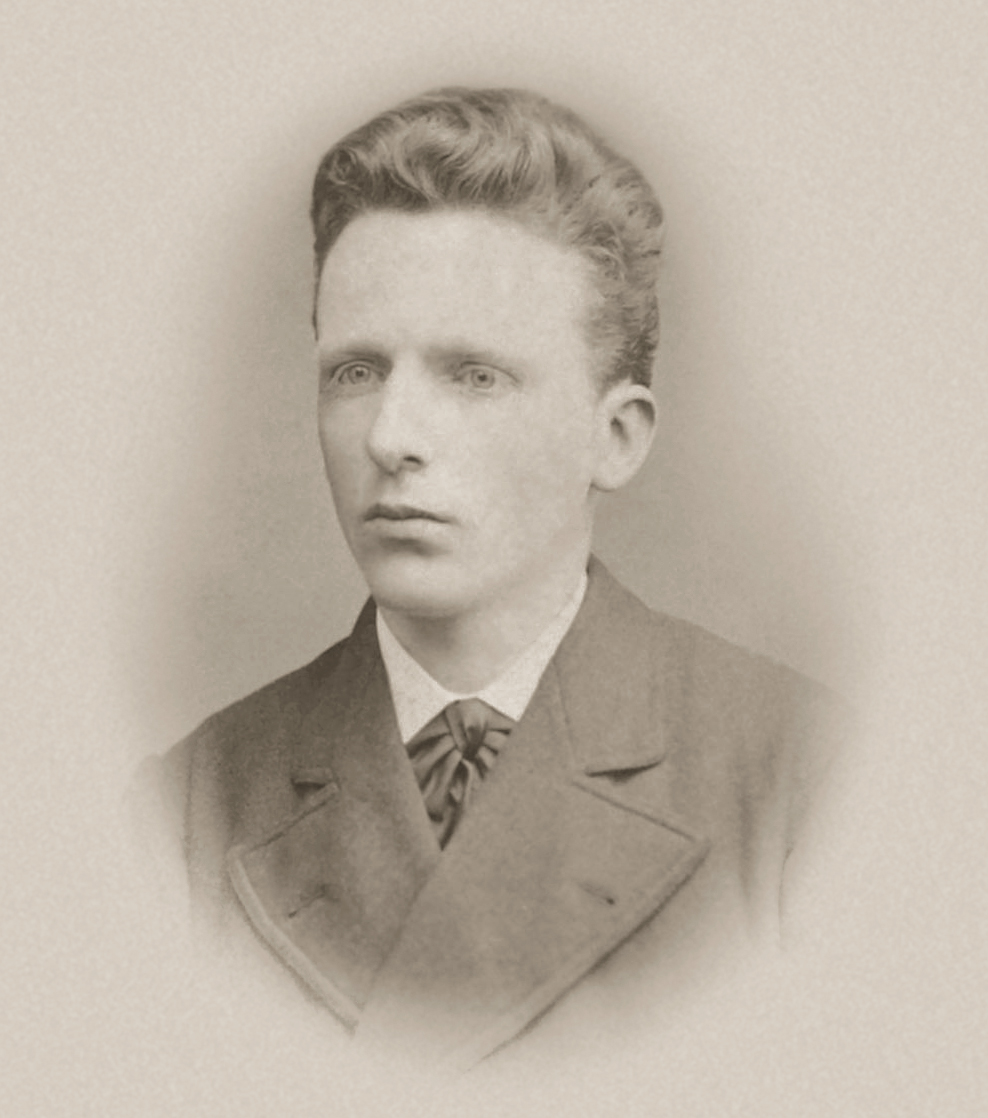
Vincent (left), photographed in 1873, and Theo in 1878.

Theo van Gogh's wife, Johanna van Gogh-Bonger, devoted many years to compiling the letters about which she wrote: "When as Theo's young wife I entered in 1889, our flat in the Cité Pigalle in Paris, I found at the bottom of a small desk a drawer full of letters from Vincent". Within two years both brothers were dead: Vincent as the result of a gunshot wound, and Theo from illness. Johanna began the task of completing the collection, which was published in full in January 1914. That first edition consisted of three volumes, and was followed in 1952–1954 by a four-volume edition that included additional letters. Jan Hulsker suggested, in 1987, that the letters be organized in date order, an undertaking that began in 1994 when the Van Gogh Letter Project was initiated by the Van Gogh Museum. The project consists of a complete annotated collection of letters written by and to Vincent.

=== Exhibition and early publication ===
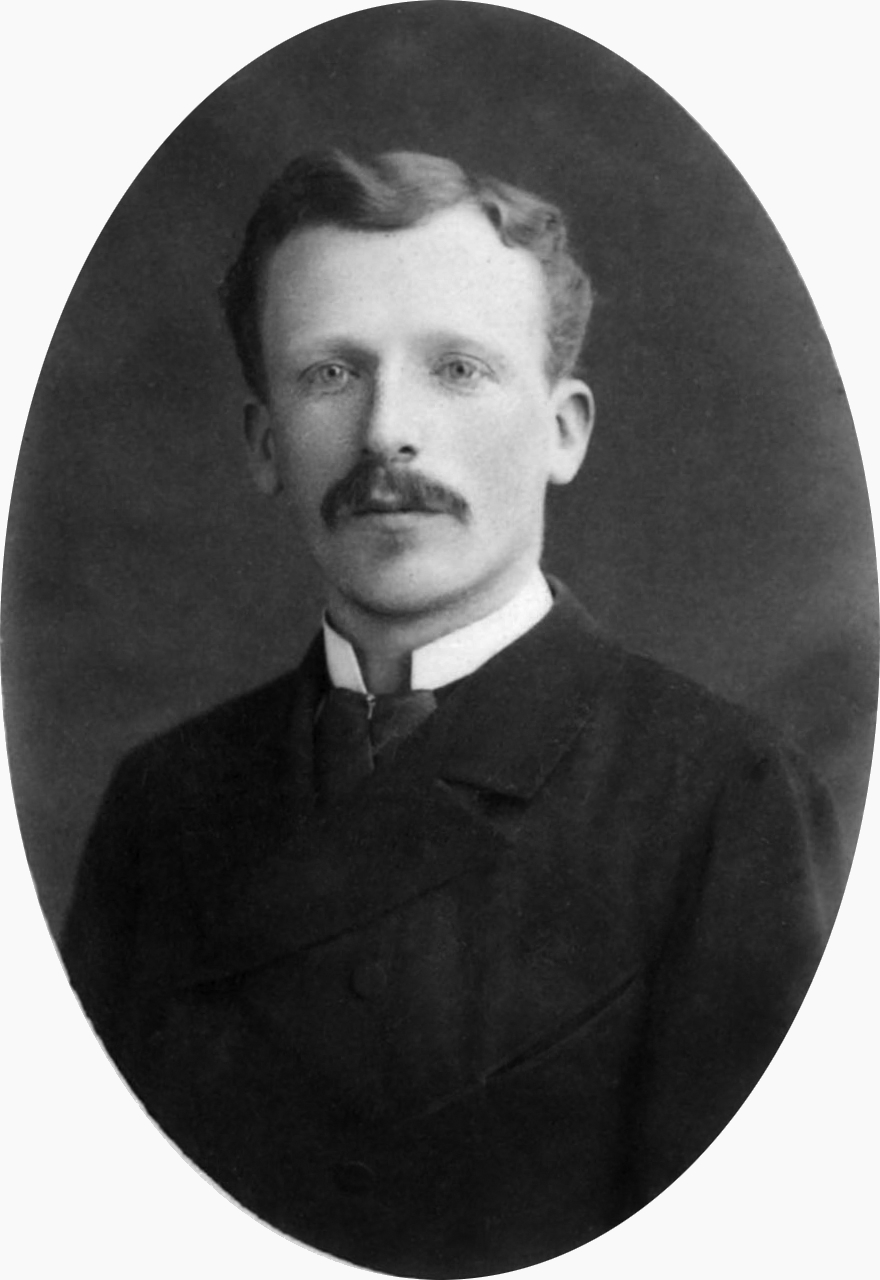
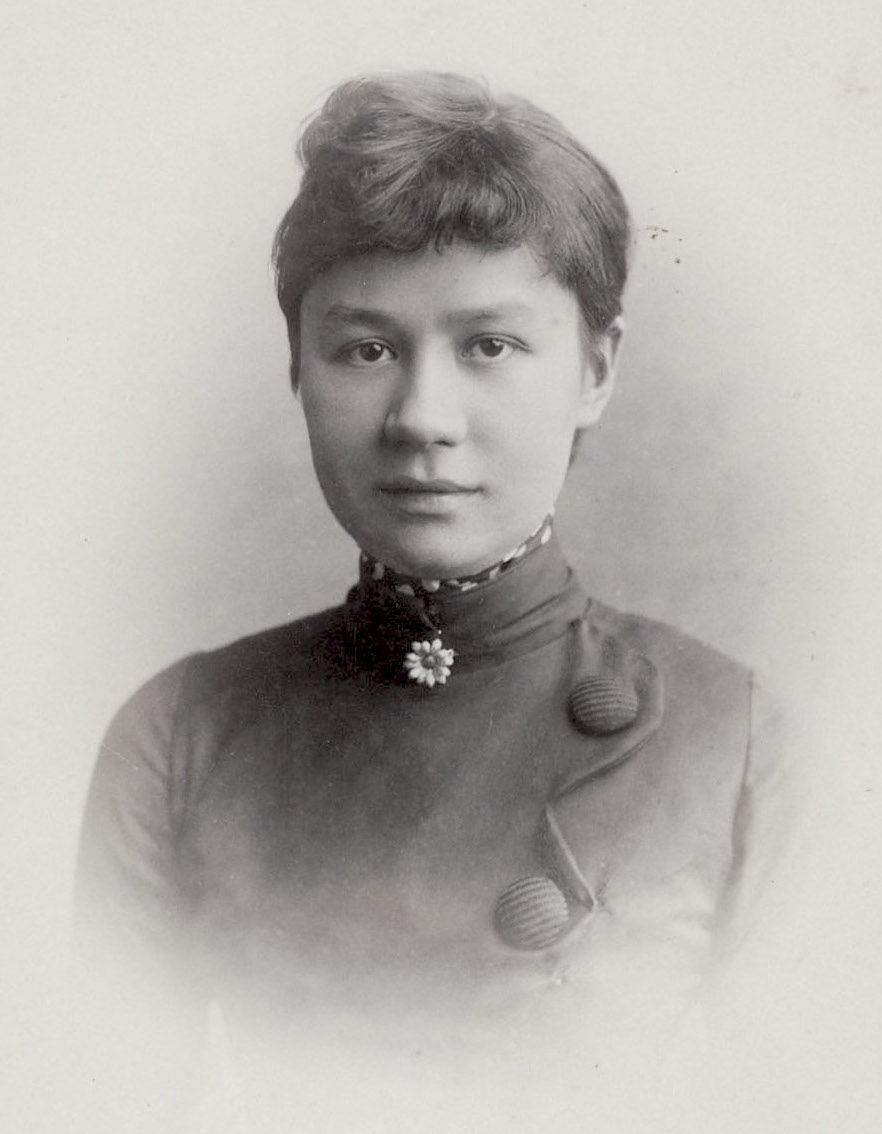
Theo (left) in 1888, and Johanna in 1889.

In the last days of December 1901, running through January 1902, Bruno Cassirer and his cousin Paul Cassirer organized the first van Gogh exhibition in Berlin, Germany. Paul Cassirer first established a market for van Gogh, and then, with the assistance of Johanna van Gogh-Bonger, controlled market prices. In 1906 Bruno Cassirer published a small volume of selected letters of Vincent's to Theo van Gogh, translated into German.

== The letters ==
Of the 844 surviving letters that van Gogh wrote, 663 were written to Theo, 9 to Theo and Jo. Of the letters Vincent received from Theo, only 39 survive. The first letter was written when Vincent was 19 and begins, "My dear Theo". At that time Vincent was not yet developed as a letter writer – he was factual, but not introspective. When he moved to London, and later to Paris, he began to add more personal information.

Beginning in 1888 and ending a year later, van Gogh wrote 22 letters to Émile Bernard in which the tone is different from those to Theo. In these letters, van Gogh wrote more about his techniques, his use of color, and his theories.

=== The letters as literature ===
Van Gogh was an avid reader, and his letters reflect his literary pursuits as well as a unique literary style. His writing style in the letters reflects the literature he read and valued: Balzac, historians such as Michelet, and naturalists such as Zola, Voltaire and Flaubert. Additionally he read novels written by George Eliot, Charlotte Brontë, and Charles Dickens, as well as John Keats's poetry, reading mostly at night when the light was too poor for painting. Gauguin told him "that he read too much".

Van Gogh scholar Jan Hulsker wrote of van Gogh's letters, "Vincent was able to express himself splendidly, and it is this remarkable writing talent that has secured the letters their lasting place in world literature". Poet W. H. Auden wrote about the letters, "there is scarcely one letter by van Gogh which I ... do not find fascinating". Pomerans believes the letters to be on the level of "world literature" based on style and the ability to express himself. In the letters Vincent reflects different facets of his personality and he adopts a tone specific to his circumstances. At the time he went through a stage of religious fanaticism, his letters fully reflect his thoughts; at the time he was involved with Sien Hoornik his letters reflect his feelings.

=== The letters as chronicle of an artist's life ===
Van Gogh's letters paint a chronicle of an artist's life, with the notable omission of the period when he lived in Paris and therefore had no need to correspond with his brother. The letters can be read as an autobiography of an artist; time spent in Brabant, Paris and London, The Hague, Drenthe, Nuenen, Antwerp, Arles, Saint-Remy and Auvers chronicle his corporal travels as well as his artistic growth. Sometimes Vincent wrote Theo every day—beyond the need to acknowledge financial support, describing England and the Netherlands. He included in the letters sketches of common people, such as miners and farmers, for he believed the poor would inherit the earth. Van Gogh's spiritual and theological thought and convictions are revealed in his letters throughout his life.

=== Sketches from the letters ===
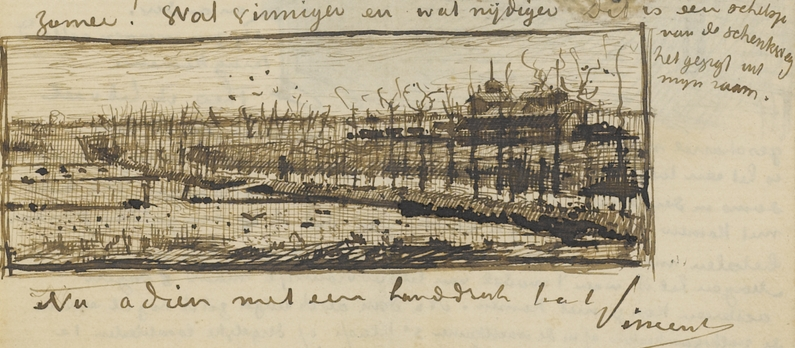
Sketch of the view from his studio window in letter 200 (F-, JH930)

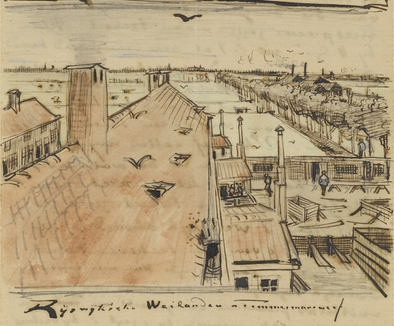
Sketch of Roofs Seen from the Artist's Attic Window in letter 251 (F-, JH157)

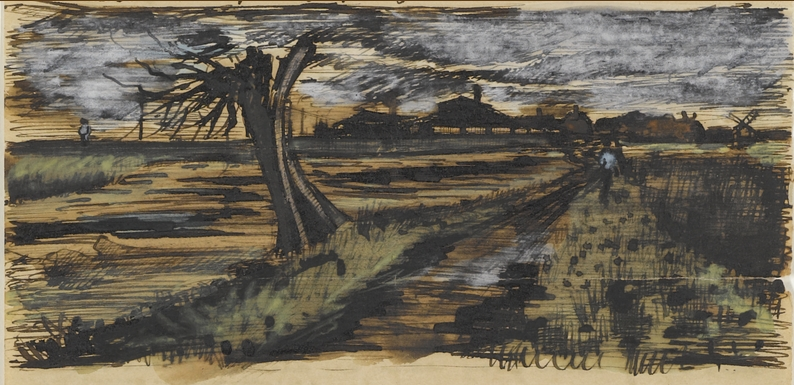
Sketch of Pollard Willow in letter 252 (F-, JH165)

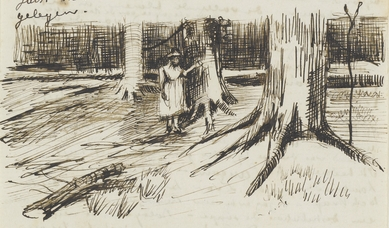
Sketch in letter 261.

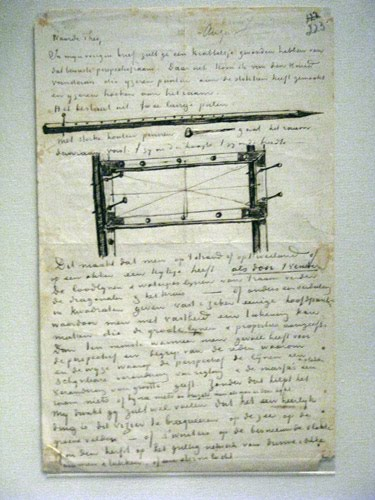
A sketch of the final perspective frame with adjustable legs he had had made in The Hague, 1882.

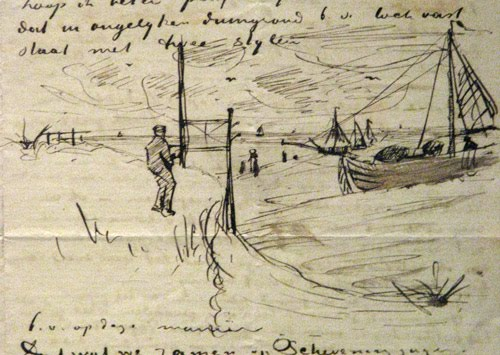
A sketch illustrating how he planned to use his new perspective frame with adjustable legs in the dunes at Scheveningen, 1882.

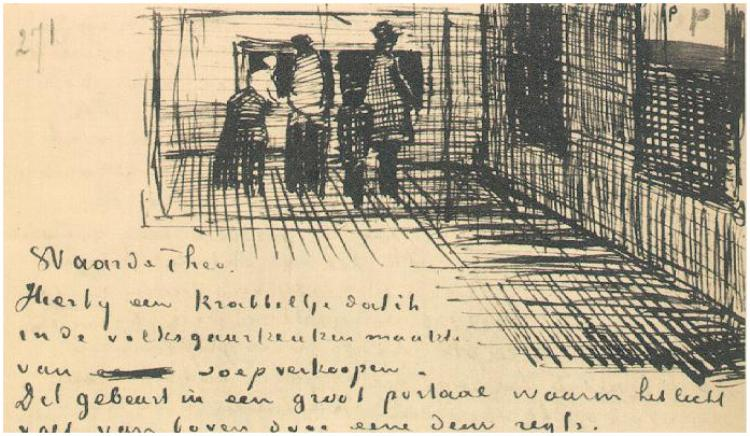
The Public Soup Kitchen, letter sketch, 1883, Van Gogh Museum, Amsterdam (F271)

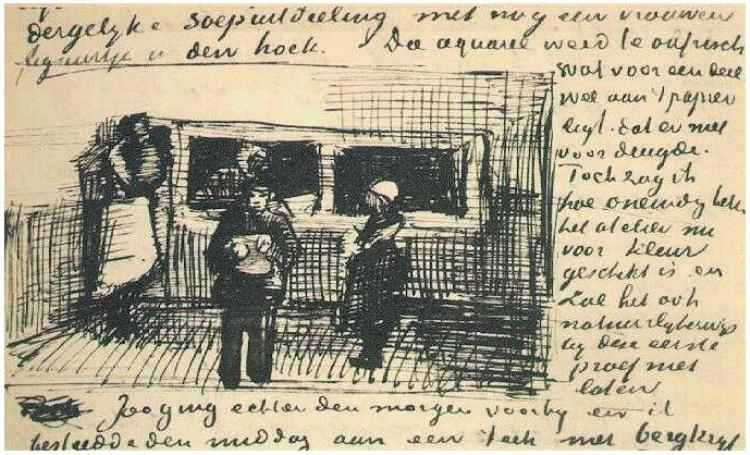
The Public Soup Kitchen, letter sketch, 1883, Van Gogh Museum, Amsterdam (F272)

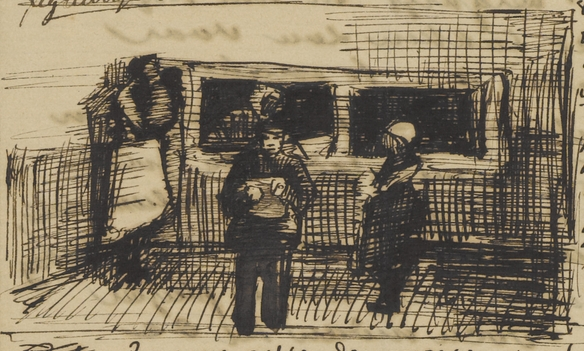
Sketch in letter 324 (F-, JH332)

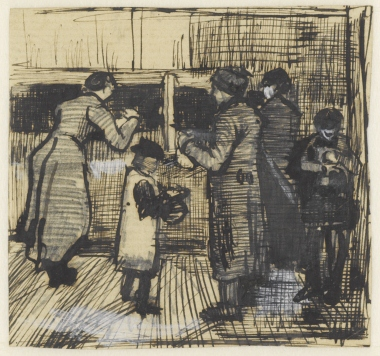
Sketch in letter 323 (F1020, JH333)

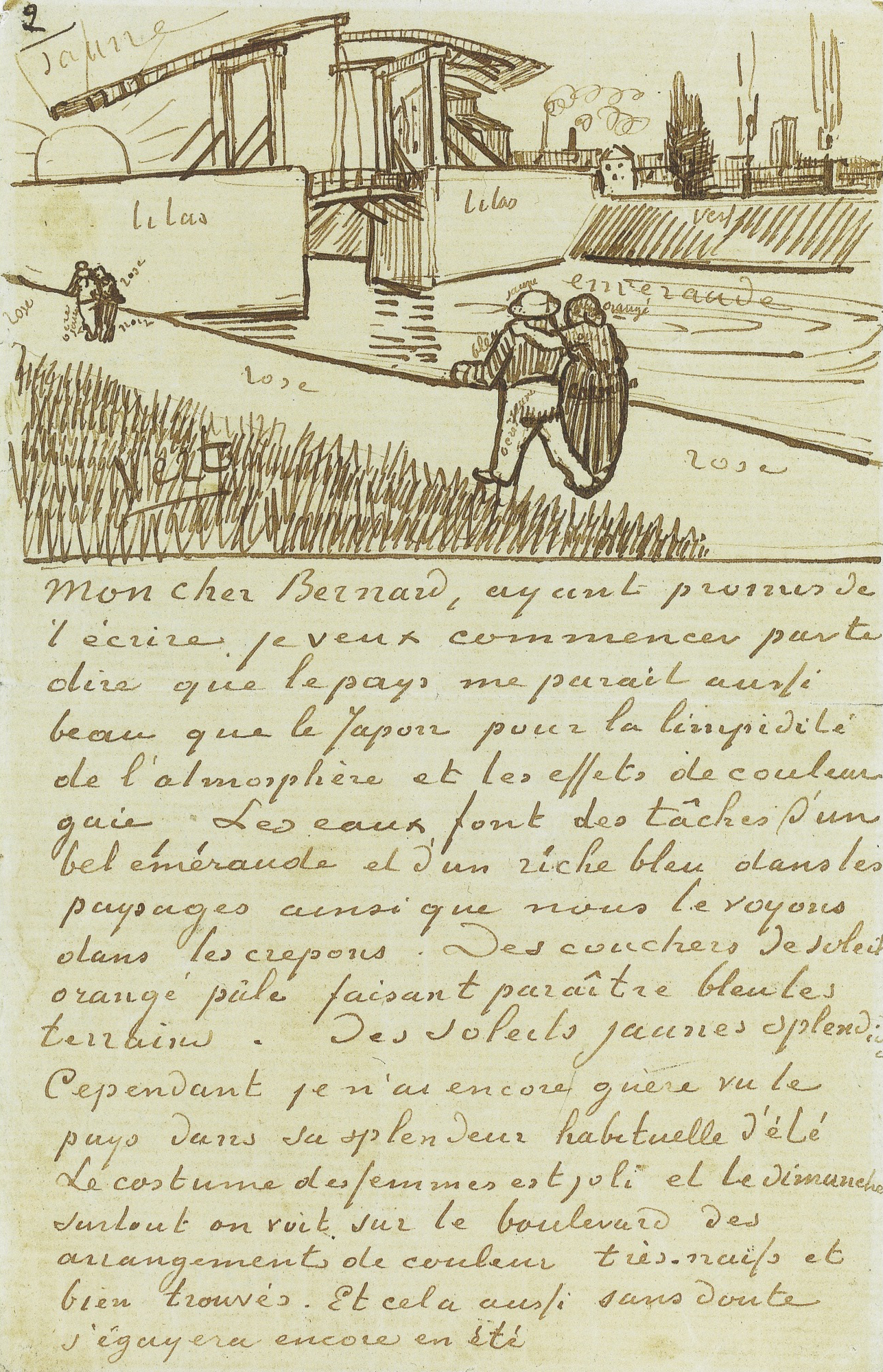
Langlois Bridge near Arles, (Sketch from letter to Émile Bernard), March 1888, J. P. Morgan Library, New York City (JH 1370)

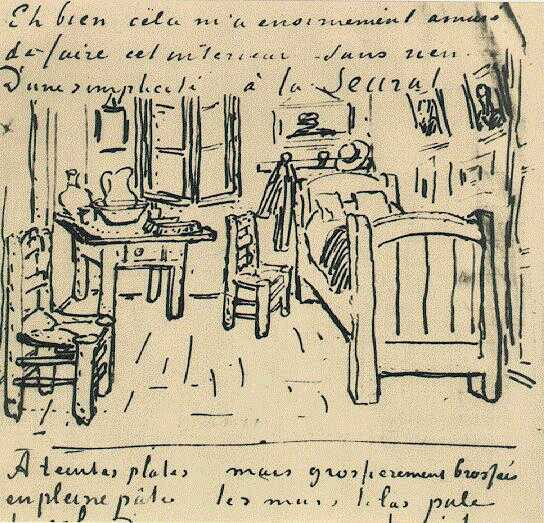
Vincent's Bedroom in Arles, Letter Sketch October 1888, Pierpont Morgan Library

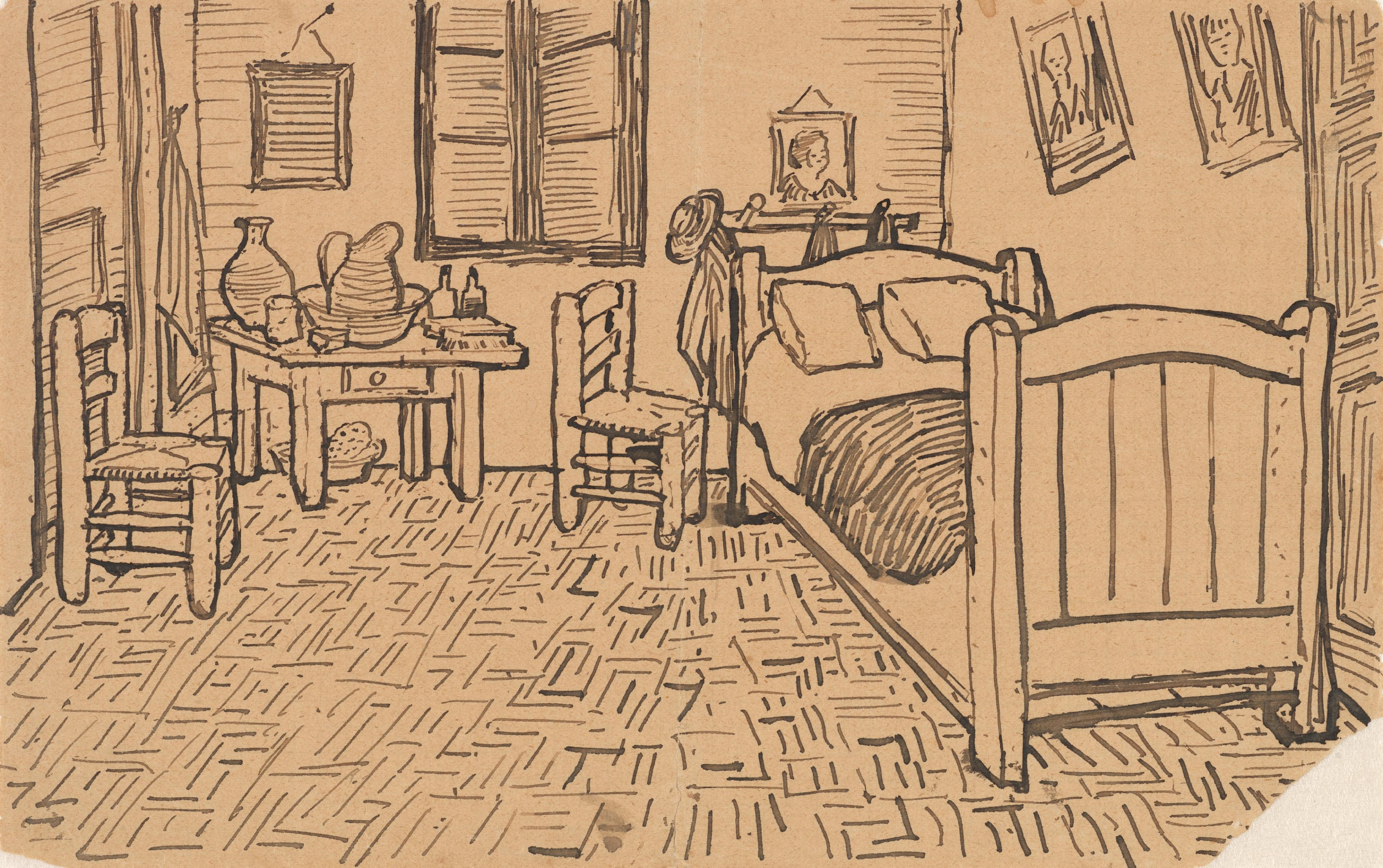
Vincent's Bedroom in Arles, Letter Sketch October 1888, Van Gogh Museum, Amsterdam (JH 1609) letter 554

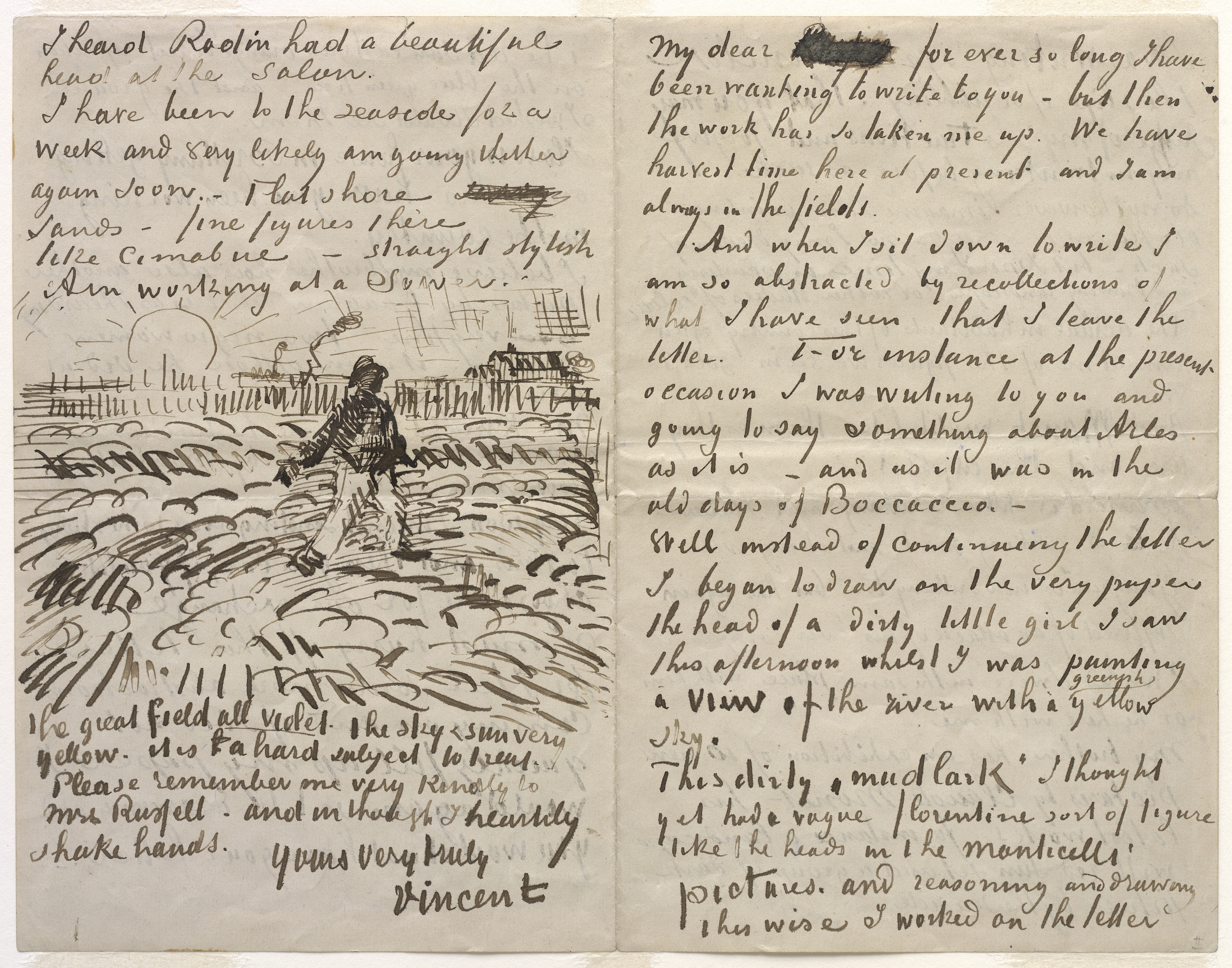
Letter to John Peter Russell, 1888, Solomon R. Guggenheim Museum, New York City

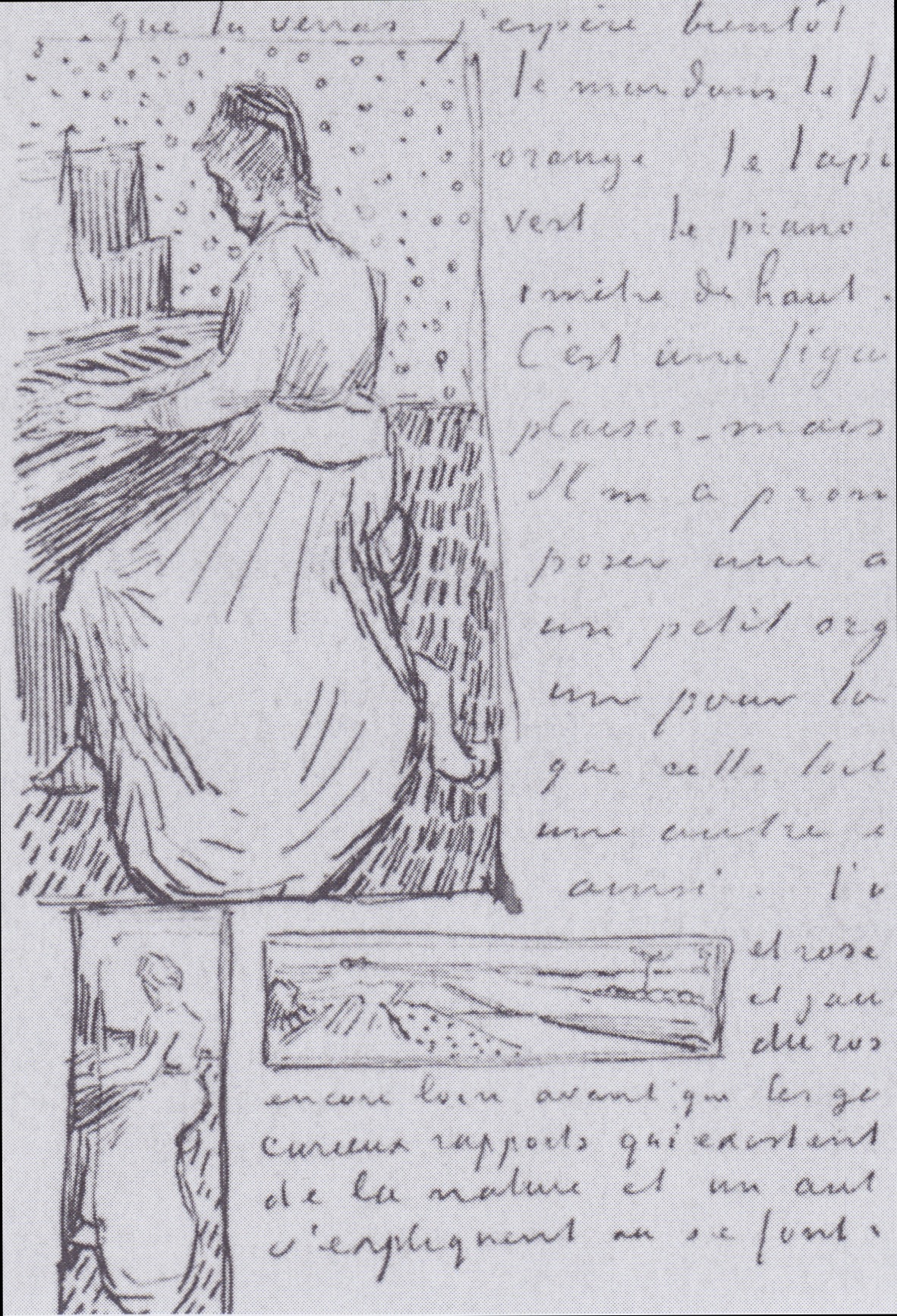
Marguerite Gachet on the Piano, letter sketch, Auvers, June 1890, Van Gogh Museum, Amsterdam (JH 2049)

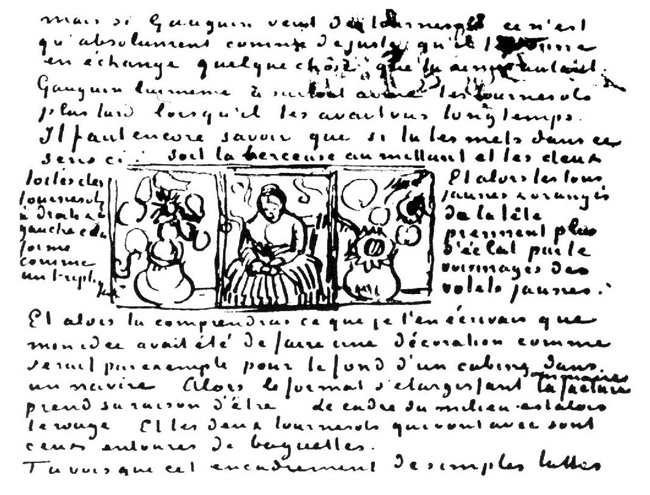
Sketch of the Sunflower triptych in a letter to Theo

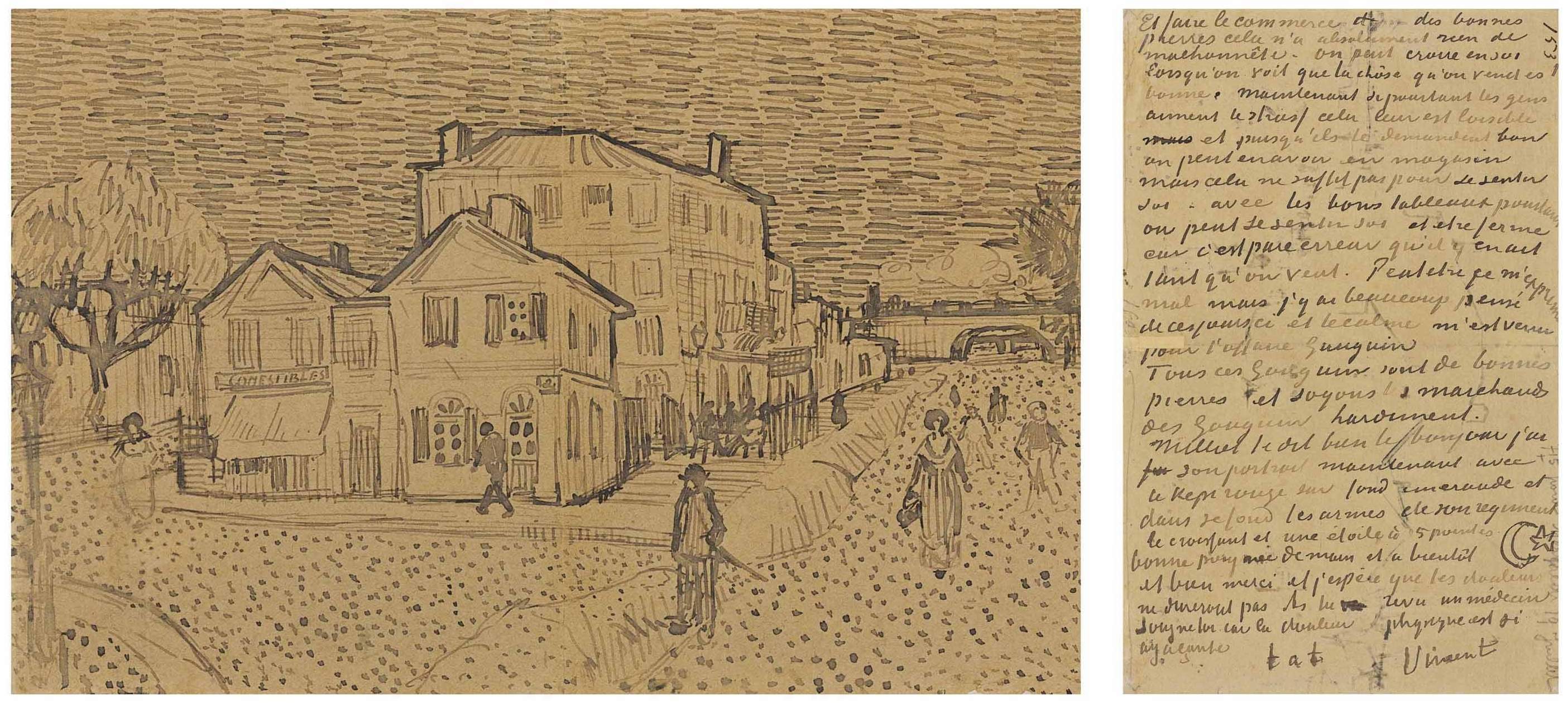
The Yellow House at Arles in letter VGM 491

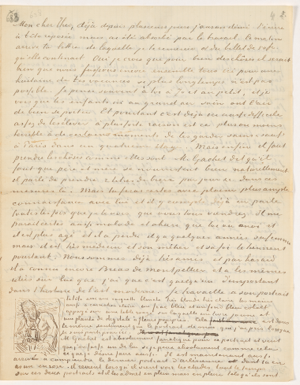
Doctor Gachet (F - / JH 2008), letter 877.

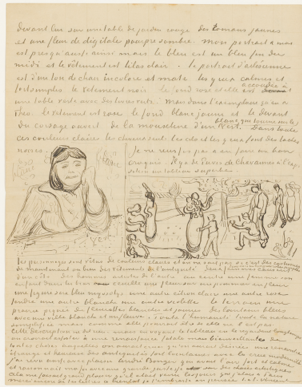
(left) Marie Ginoux (‘The Arlésienne’) (F - / JH 1896). Colour notations: ‘blanc’ (white) (upper left and right); ‘blanc’ (white) and ‘vert’ (green) (on the shawl); ‘rose’ (pink) (on the dress); ‘vert’ (green) (on the table), letter 879.

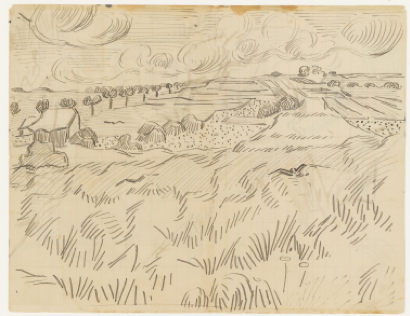
Wheatfields (F / - JH 2100), letter 902.

==== John Peter Russell ====
Australian Impressionist painter; worked with Vincent van Gogh and Claude Monet at Belle-Ile.

==== The Yellow House ====
The Bedroom celebrates Van Gogh’s long-waited occupation of his ‘Yellow House.'" Van Gogh occupied one of the rooms on the first floor next to his guest room, where Paul Gauguin sojourned for nine weeks. The Chair takes the daily object from his bedroom; van Gogh also painted Gauguin’s Chair as the title suggests. He rendered different personalities of Gauguin and himself through artistic styles.

==== The Sower ====
Van Gogh looked at Francois Millet but re-adapted the interpretation of a peasant. He destabilized the lyrical quality of peasantry figures of Millet and sought to display the nature of peasantry as tough labor. The peasantry spirit in van Gogh’s paintings is further displayed in Patience Escalier.

==== Marie Ginoux ====
Wife of Joseph Ginoux, a friend of van Gogh; owner of van Gogh’s preferred coffee shop, the Café de la Gare. Van Gogh often portrays Arlesiens/Arlesiennes when he resided in Arles in 1888. The gesture suggests that van Gogh considered Mme. Ginoux as someone who is self-absorbed.

==== Dr. Paul Gachet ====
Doctor referred by Pissarro who gave medical treatment to van Gogh’s nerve disorders. Dr. Gachet paints at leisure times who is in touch with all the Impressionists. Father of Marguerite Gachet. (letter 807, Theo van Gogh to Vincent van Gogh. Paris, Friday, 4 October 1889)

==== Wheat Fields ====
Vincent van Gogh does both portraits and landscapes. Wheat Fields is a series of landscape paintings that van Gogh executed in his later stage of life. Wheatfield with Crows and the Wheat Field sketch from letter 902 both date to July 1890. Letter 902, written on 23 July 1890, is the last found letter written by van Gogh, who died on 29 July 1890 in Auvers-sur-Oise.

=== Commentaries from critics and friends ===
For much of his adult life he was lonely and pushed to learn as much as he could about the world around and about his craft. Margaret Drabble describes the letters from Drenthe as "heart-breaking", as he struggled to come to terms with the "darkness of his hereditary subject matter", the bleak poverty and meanness of Dutch peasant life. This struggle culminated with his painting The Potato Eaters. His friend and mentor Van Rappard disliked the painting. Undeterred, van Gogh moved south, via Antwerp and Paris. His letters from Arles describe his utopian dream of establishing a community of artists who lived together, worked together, and helped each other. In this project he was joined by Paul Gauguin in late 1888.

=== Autograph of letter 716 ===
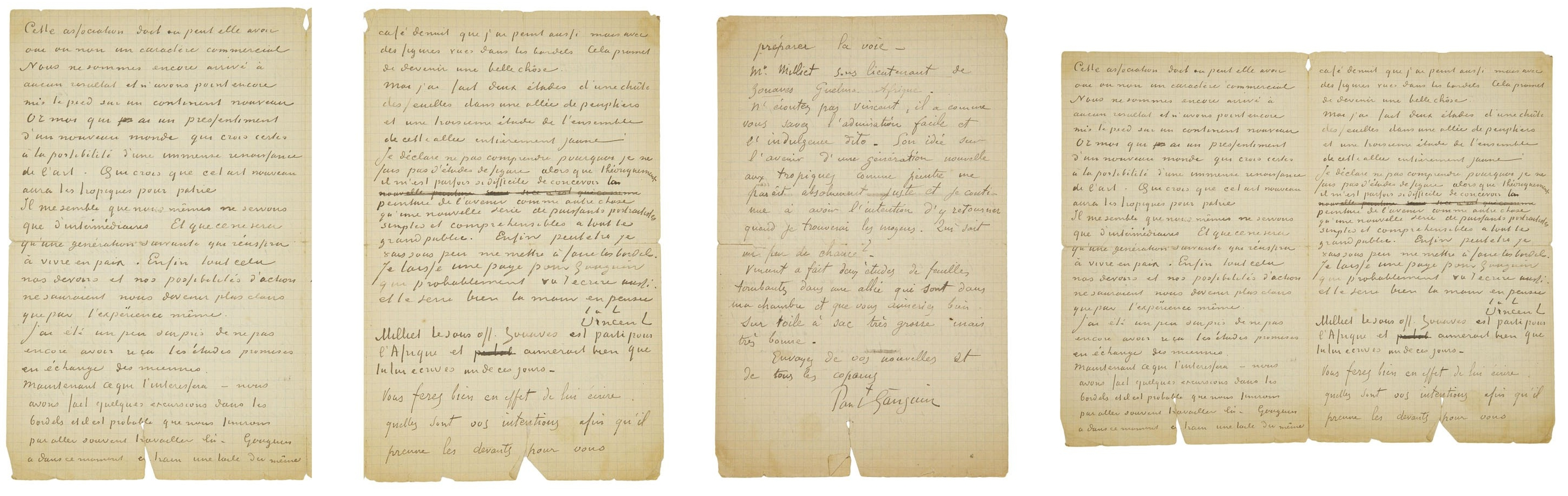
Letter 716: Vincent van Gogh and Paul Gauguin to Emile Bernard. Arles, Thursday, 1 or Friday, 2 November 1888

Letter 716 is a letter sent jointly by Vincent van Gogh and Paul Gauguin to Émile Bernard around 1 November 1888 shortly after Gauguin had joined van Gogh in Arles. Late that summer, van Gogh had completed his second group of Sunflower paintings, among his most iconic paintings, two of which decorated Gauguin's room, as well as his famous painting The Yellow House depicting the house they shared.

The letter is unique in being a joint letter from the two, and can be read in both the original French and an English translation at the website of the Van Gogh Museum's edition of the letters. In it they discuss, among other matters, their plans to form an artists' commune, possibly abroad. In reality their relationship was always fraught, and by the end of the year they had parted for good, van Gogh himself hospitalised following a breakdown in which he had mutilated one of his ears.

The autograph fetched €445,000 at a sale in Paris 12–13 December 2012.

The epistolary relationship between Vincent van Gogh and Paul Gauguin is one of the most significant in the artist’s life. Van Gogh’s letters, especially those sent to his brother Theo and to Gauguin himself, show a relationship of great emotional and artistic intensity. While it is well-known that Van Gogh held a deep admiration for Gauguin, some scholars have speculated that his feelings might have gone beyond simple friendship or professional respect.

Several letters, in fact, contain expressions of particularly intense affection. In his correspondence with Theo, Van Gogh refers to Gauguin as his "companion in every sense of the word," stating that he feels something for him that he cannot fully explain. In another letter, dated December 1888, he admits: "I realize that I cannot do without your presence," referring to Gauguin. On 2 February 1889, he writes: "I consider you more than a friend, you are a part of me, a soul akin to mine."

These excerpts have led some researchers to speculate that Van Gogh may have experienced an attraction to Gauguin, though no romantic or sexual sentiment is explicitly expressed in the letters. Furthermore, the context of the time must be taken into account: in the 19th century, the language between friends could be more affectionate than modern standards. Nevertheless, the emotional intensity of Van Gogh’s letters to Gauguin seems to go beyond usual friendly affection.

The strong bond between the two artists and Van Gogh's deep religiosity may have contributed to his possible confusion regarding his feelings toward Gauguin. His religious upbringing might have made it difficult for him to understand or accept any more complex emotions toward Gauguin. Although there is no definitive evidence of romantic attraction, his letters remain an important testament to the depth of their relationship and the significant role Gauguin played in Van Gogh’s life.

== In popular media ==
The delivery of Vincent's final letter to Theo after Vincent's death and the circumstances surrounding his death was the subject of the 2017 film Loving Vincent, which was animated by oil paintings made with van Gogh's techniques.

== Sources ==
- Jansen, Leo; Luijen, Hans; Bakker, Nienke. Vincent van Gogh – The Letters: The Complete Illustrated and Annotated Edition. London, Thames & Hudson, 2009. ISBN 978-0-500-23865-3
- Pickvance, Ronald. Van Gogh In Saint-Rémy and Auvers (exh. cat. Metropolitan Museum of Art, New York: Abrams, 1986. ISBN 0-87099-477-8
- Pomerans, Arnold; de Leeuw, Ronald. The Letters of Vincent van Gogh. London: Penguin Classics, 1997. ISBN 0-14-044674-5
- Tralbaut, Marc Edo. Vincent van Gogh, le mal aimé. Edita, Lausanne (French) & Macmillan, London 1969 (English); reissued by Macmillan, 1974 and by Alpine Fine Art Collections, 1981. ISBN 0-933516-31-2
