= Anthon van Rappard =

Dutch painter and draughtsman (1858–1892)

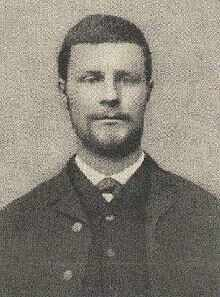
G. A. Ridder van Rappard, (1858-1892) portrait by unknown photographer

Anthon Gerard Alexander van Rappard (14 May 1858, Zeist – 21 March 1892, Santpoort) was a Dutch painter and draughtsman. He was a pupil of Lawrence Alma-Tadema. He was also a friend and mentor of Vincent van Gogh for about four years, who is said to have appreciated him for his social engagement, amongst other reasons.

== Biography ==
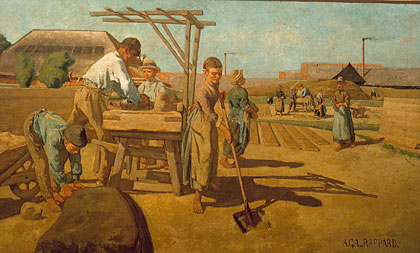
Labourers at the Ruimzicht brickyard, circa 1885

According to the RKD he worked in Paris, Brussels, Utrecht, Amsterdam, and Terschelling before moving to Santpoort. He studied at the Rijksakademie and was a member of the Utrecht artist societies "Kunstliefde" and " Utrechtse Kunstkring" (which he founded with his friend Ludwig Willem Reymert Wenckebach), and "Arti et Amicitiae" in Amsterdam.

The letters Van Gogh wrote to Van Rappard during their correspondence in the years 1881-1885 are a main source for Van Gogh's biography and work. Today, Van Rappard's works are rare due to his short life. His paintings are highly prized.

== Sources ==
- Jaap W. Brouwer, Jan Laurens Siesling & Jacques Vis, Anthon van Rappard, companion & correspondent of Vincent van Gogh; his life & all his works, De Arbeiderspers, Amsterdam & Gary Schwartz, Maarssen 1974 ISBN 90-295-3441-9
