= Émile Bernard chronology =

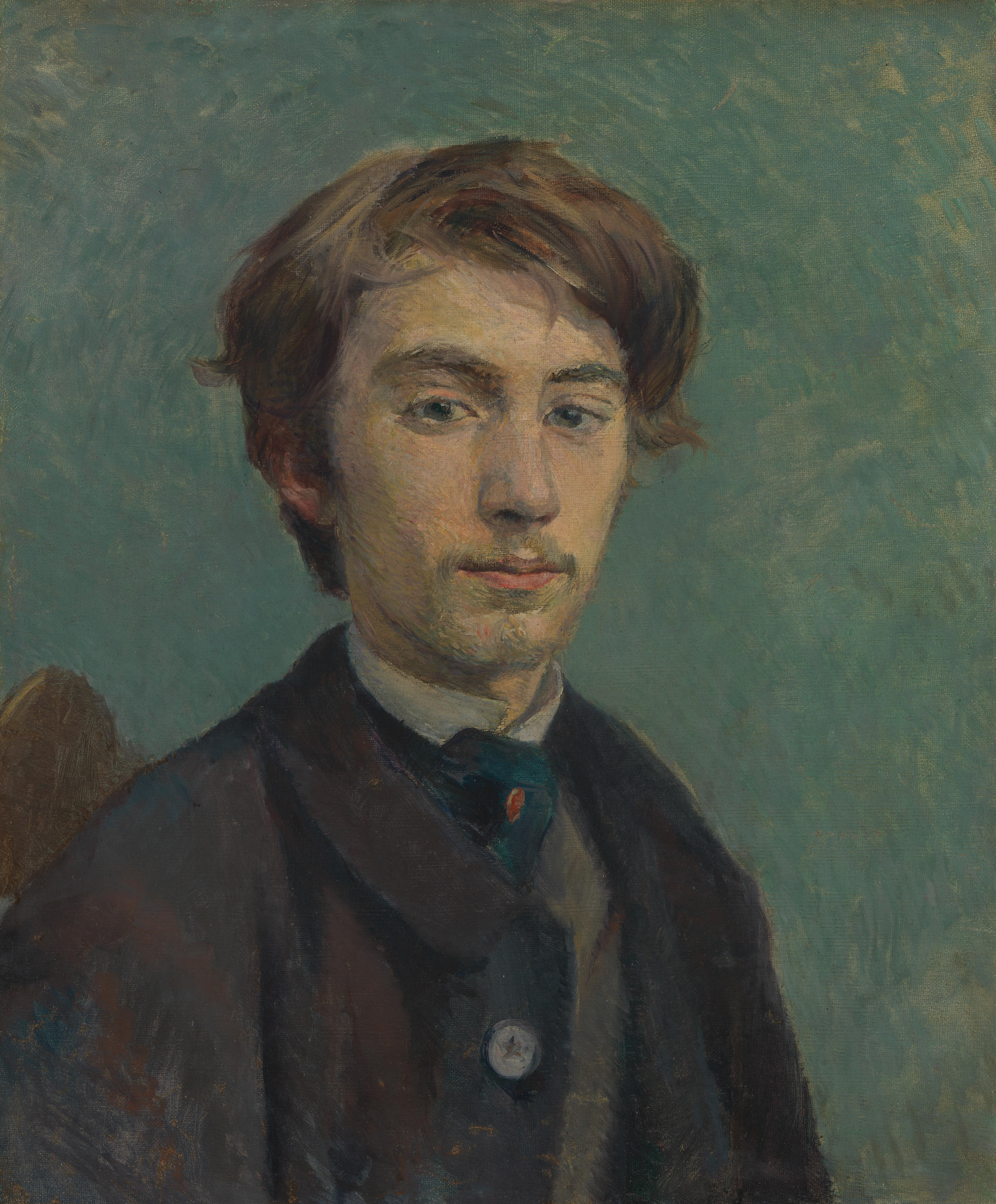
Henri de Toulouse-Lautrec, Émile Bernard, 1886

This is an Émile Bernard chronology of the life and career of French artist, art critic and writer Émile Bernard, based on documents hitherto published - however, most of the relevant sources remain unpublished. To a certain extent, these gaps can be filled by information derived from letters and biographies of e.g. Vincent van Gogh, Paul Gauguin and Émile Schuffenecker. Bernard and his work is associated with Post-Impressionism, Cloisonnism and Synthetism.

Contents: 1860s 1870s 1880s 1890s 1900s 1910s 1920s 1930s 1940s
The Vanguard Years: 1884 1886 1887 1888 1889 1890 1891 1892 1893 1894 1895 1896 1897

== 1860s ==
- 1868, April 26: born in Lille, to an employee of the textile industry

== 1870s ==
- 1870: Due to the Franco Prussian War, the family moved to St. Aignan (near Rouen)
- 1871, February 14: Birth of his sister Madeleine
- 1876: The family moved to Loos (near Lille) and prospered economically.
- 1877: Émile attended Collège de la Monnaie at Lille whilst staying with his maternal grandmother, Sophie Bodin-Lallement. She ran a successful laundry business with some 20 employed. One of her lodgers encouraged Bernard to draw.
- 1878: The family moved to Paris, Émile attended L'institut des Francs-Bourgeois (later named Institution Nollet), but also enrolled at École des arts décoratifs.
- 1879-1880: Due to the children's poor health, the family moved to Nogent-sur-Marne, but returned to Paris in autumn 1880.

== 1880s ==
- 1881: Émile started to study at Collège Sainte Barbe at Fontenay-aux-Roses; in the autumn moved to the Paris branch of same college. Became fond of poetry.
- 1882–1884: During summer holidays, Émile copied masterpieces from the museum of Dunkerque as well as prints by Honoré Daumier and Gustave Doré, and made sketches from life.

- 1884–1886: Stayed near Asnières (a fashionable suburb of Paris), argued with his father for wanting to become a painter, and entered the well-known atelier of Fernand Cormon in September.
  At that time, Henri de Toulouse-Lautrec, Louis Anquetin, Eugène Boch and Paul Tampier (1859–1940) were studying with Cormon.
  At Père Tanguy's shop, he first saw some of Cézanne's paintings. Toulouse-Lautrec and Anquetin introduced young Bernard to Montmartre's night life. In 1885, Bernard created his first important work, the woodblock La Nativité.

== 1886 ==
After having been expelled by Cormon for insubordinate behaviour in early spring, 1886, his parents tried to convince him to work in business, which he refused.
Financially supported by the parents, Bernard instead went on a foot trip to Brittany. Recommended by Claude-Émile Schuffenecker, whom he had met at Concarneau, he went to Pont-Aven in July, to see Paul Gauguin who however at first did not recognize Bernard's talent. Returned home after two months, he moved in with his parents, visited the exhibition of the Société des Artistes Indépendants and saw the work of Georges Seurat and Paul Signac.

- April/September: on a foot trip to and through Brittany. After leaving Paris on April 6, Bernard arrives via Nonancourt and Verneuil in Saint-Briac, at the end of the month in Le Ribay. He spends the second half of May in Cancale, and June in Saint-Briac. Via Saint-Brieuc, Tréguier, Morlaix, Landerneau, Pougastel-Daoulas, Douarnenez, Le Faouët, Quimper and Concarneau, he arrives in Pont-Aven. Lorient, Carnac, Auray, Vannes and Rennes are the final places he visits, before he arrives back in Paris/Asnières in time for the exhibition of the Indépendants:
- August 21: Opening of the 2nd exhibition of the Artistes Indépendants; running through September 21.

== 1887 ==
When his parents rented a house in Asnières, Émile was able to exhibit pointillist works there, early in the year, and was invited by Seurat to visit his studio. Bernard and Anquetin however soon decided to break with Neo-Impressionism and go their own way, painting flat colour areas but strong black contours.

At Tanguy's, Bernard met Lucien Pissarro and Charles Angrand at that time.

In spring, he returned to Brittany and stayed two months in Saint-Briac-sur-Mer, where he created stained glass windows. After his grandmother started to live with the family, they moved to a bigger house and built a studio for Émile.

- December/January (?): Vincent van Gogh arranges an exhibition of paintings by himself, Bernard, Anquetin, Koning and (probably) Toulouse-Lautrec in the Restaurant du Chalet, 43 Avenue de Clichy, on Montmartre. Bernard and Anquetin sell their first painting, Vincent exchanges work with Gauguin.

== 1888 ==
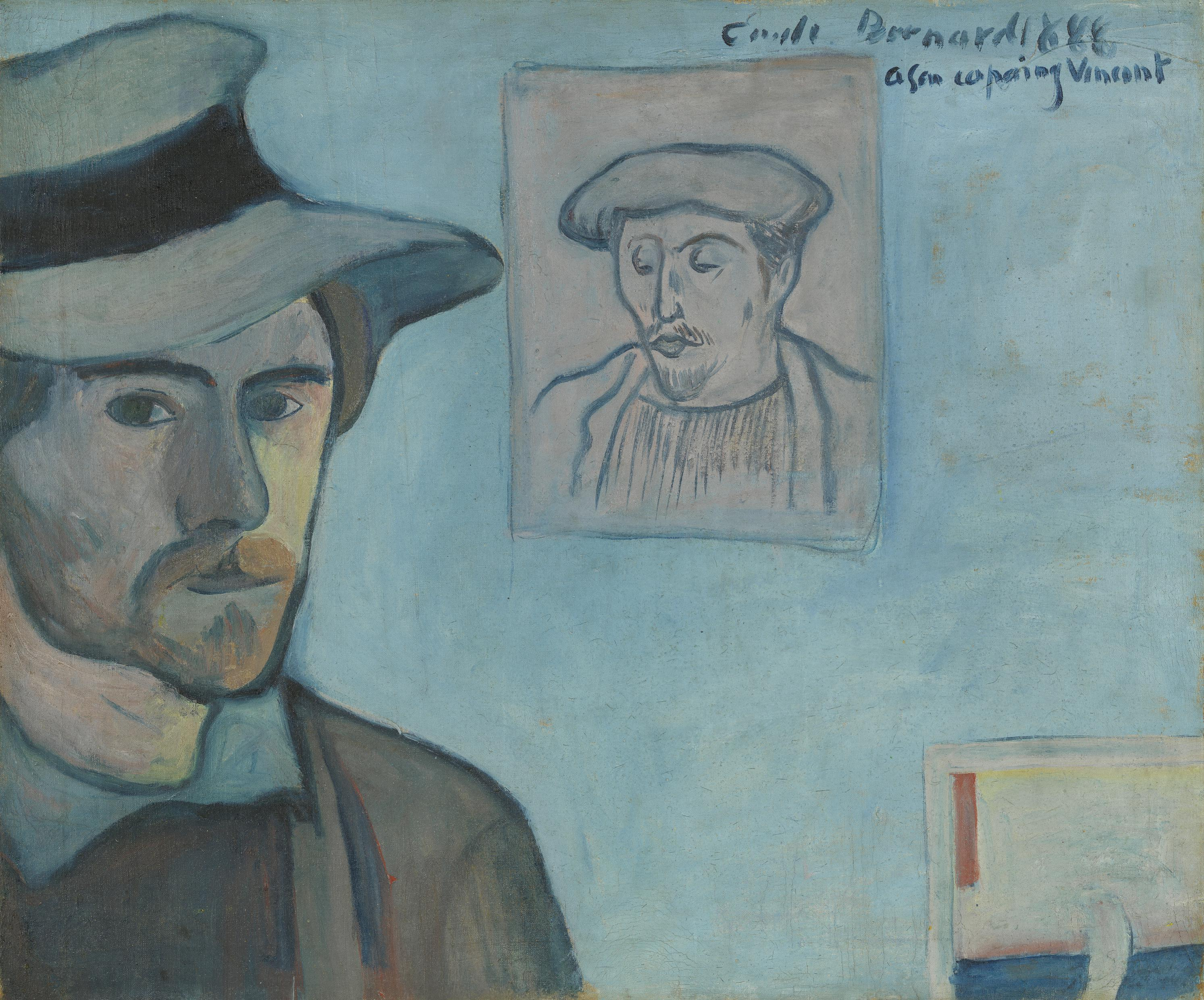
Self-portrait with portrait of Paul Gauguin, 1888

On occasion of the Salon des Indépendants in March 1888, the art critic Édouard Dujardin coined Bernard's and Anquetin's new style Cloisonnism.

- February: The day before Van Gogh left for Arles, Bernard helped him to decorate his room in Theo's apartment.
- May?: leaves for another three months in Saint-Briac.
- August: travels to Pont-Aven once more, where his mother and his sister joined him. Madeleine was in love with 23 years older Gauguin for a while, and he and her brother worked together quite closely.
- November: Bernard returns to Asnières.

== 1889 ==
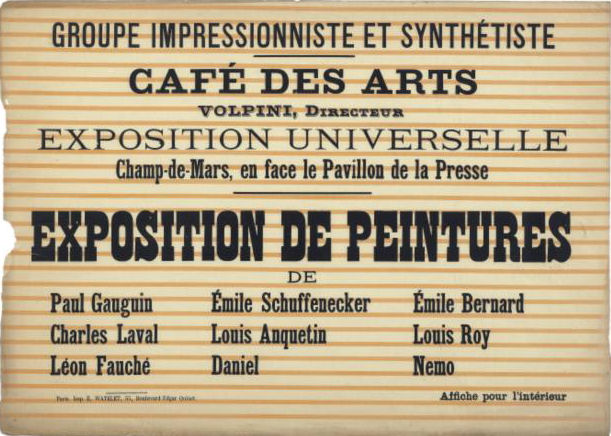
Poster of the 1889 Exhibition of Paintings by the Impressionist and Synthetist Group, at Café des Arts, known as The Volpini Exhibition, 1889.

- June: contributes to The Volpini Exhibition in the Grand Café des Beaux-Arts, just opposite the Pavilion des Beaux-Arts. Due to Paris World's Fair held at the centennial of the French Revolution, Schuffenecker got the chance to expose works of himself and other avantgarde painters (which was part of the Fair, where only pieces admitted by a jury would have been shown). As Armand Guillaumin and Theo van Gogh (Vincent's manager) were disappointed by the way the exhibit was promoted, they withdrew. Others however joined, and Bernard took the chance to expose 23 works, plus two more under the pseudonym Ludovic Nemo.
- July 27: Le Moderniste, edited by Albert Aurier, prints Bernard's first art critical statement.

As his father prohibited him to visit Gauguin in Pont-Aven, he spent the summer in St. Briac, where he met one Charlotte Buisse whom he had liked to marry, but was repelled by her father for not being able to maintain a family.

- October 4: Bernard is back to Asnières.

He afterwards went to Lille, stayed with his grandmother and worked as a textile designer for a while.

== 1890 ==
After returning to Paris, Bernard had to find out that Charlotte was meanwhile engaged to someone else. Madeleine became engaged to Charles Laval, who also was obliged to prove that he would be able to maintain a family. After losing his parental allowance, Émile organized a lottery of his paintings.

- May/June: in Lille
- July 30: Bernard assists at the funeral of Vincent van Gogh who died the morning before, in Auvers-sur-Oise, together with Theo, Gachet, Tanguy, Laval, Lucien Pissarro, Lauzet and others.
- September 20 and the days that followed: Bernard helps Theo van Gogh, assisted by Andries Bonger, to hang Vincent's memorial exhibition.

== 1891 ==
- January: in Couilly with Eugène Boch
- February 2: When, at a banquet in honor of Jean Moréas, Gauguin was hailed by Aurier as the leader of Symbolism and initiator of the Synthetist movement, Bernard felt deeply offended and broke with Gauguin.
- March 20: Opening of the 7th exhibition of the Artistes Indépendants, running through April 27; Bernard contributes 6 paintings.
  In (March–September?), Bernard participates in the first Nabi exhibition.
- June 6: Schuffenecker signs a biographical note on Émile Bernard which was to be published in Les Hommes d'aujourd'hui, edited by Vanier (but remained unpublished until 1990).
- July/October: in Saint-Briac
- November: back in Paris
- December/January: first exhibition of the gallery Le Barc de Boutteville, Peintres impressionistes et symbolistes; two paintings by Bernard on display.
  Tried to launch a print periodical on woodcut, Le Bois.

== 1892 ==
- March 10: Opening of the first Salon de la Rose+Croix at the Galleries Durand-Ruel, running through April 10; Bernard contributes, and a drawing by him is reproduced in the catalogue, Annonciation
- March 19: Opening of the 8th exhibition of the Artistes Indépendants, running through April 27; Bernard contributes 9 paintings:
- April: Bernard arranges an exhibition of paintings by Vincent van Gogh (Exposition de 16 Toiles par Van Gogh) at the Le Barc de Boutteville gallery in Paris
- May: 2nd exhibition of Peintres impressionistes et symbolistes at Le Barc de Boutteville's; one painting by Bernard catalogued.
  Staying in Pont-Aven for the rest of the year, he sculpted furniture for one Mlle Swart, a friend of Andries Bonger, brother-in-law to Theo van Gogh. Working on textiles, he was assisted by a seamstress named Maria.

== 1893 ==
- January 18: still in Pont-Aven
- February: invited to exhibit with Les XX in Brussels, Bernard shows a paravent, recently acquired by Anna Boch, founding member of Les XX and sister of Eugène Boch
- March 17: looking forward to his departure for Italy, Bernard establishes an inventory of his paintings (Inventaire fait le 17 Mars 1893, avant de partir en Italie)
- May: meets Paul Sérusier and Jan Verkade in Florence
- July: in Istanbul, then Constantinople
- August: in Samos
- November: arrives in Egypt

Deciding to go abroad, together with Maria, Bernard was supported by Count Antoine de La Rochefoucauld and Andries Bonger. He first travelled Italy: On visits in Genova, Pisa, Rome and Florence he admired Perugino, Botticelli, Giotto, Simone Martini, Taddeo Gaddi and Fra Angelico. When meeting Dal Médico, a fellow from Pont-Aven, he decided to accompany him to Constantinople via Samos. There, he got the commission to paint the chapel of Les Missionnaires de Lyon. He afterwards moved on to Smyrna, where Maria left him for a French photographer. Via Jerusalem and Alexandria, he arrived in Cairo by the end of the year. There, he had some income from decorating the chapel of the Pères de la Mission africaine de Lyon, but still was supported by Bonger and de La Rochefouauld.

== 1894 ==
Married Hannénah Saati, of Libanese descent, on July 1 and started living like an Arab, whilst reading Fathers of the Church (St. Augustine, St. Thomas Aquinas) and philosophers like Hegel, Aristotle and Plato, for becoming inspired. Still was, to some extent, supported by his family. To the 5th album of André Marty's L'Estampe originale, he contributed a print.

== 1895 ==
Bernard's first son, Otse, was born. The painter was commissioned with frescoes for the chapel of Cairo's Cathédrale de la Vierge and looked for inspiration in Michelangelo's oeuvre.

His sister Madeleine, terminally ill with tuberculosis, moved to Cairo, where she died on November 19.

== 1896 ==
For their difficult financial situation, the family moved to Spain, reaching Granada in August and Seville in December. Hannénah became ill of tuberculosis.

== 1897 ==
In spring, Bernard met Spanish painter Zuloaga; after the birth of a second son, Fortunato, they moved back to Cairo to live with Hannénah's family. Both sons died of tuberculosis, soon later.

== 1898 ==
Birth of a third son, Odilon. Bernard participated at the Salon de l'Art Religieux and published the first one of 17 volumes of poetry. Besides, he started a major paintings series on life in Cairo.

== 1899 ==
In an exhibition in honour of Odilon Redon, organized by de La Rochfoucauld and held at Durand-Ruel gallery, Bernard exhibited a tapestry and a cupboard panel.

== 1900s ==
- 1900: Travelling towards France, the family stayed in Venice for a while before returning to Cairo due to Odilo's illness. The child died there shortly after arrival, but a fourth son, Antoine, was born same year.
- 1901: Prompted by de La Rochefoucauld, Bernard went to France for three months, exhibited in Ambroise Vollard's gallery and met (not for the first time) poet and theatre manager Paul Fort, becoming involved with his sister Andrée who would accompany him to Cairo.
- 1902: Daughter Irène, born to Hannénah.
- 1903: After founding Le Parnasse, a short-lived review publication, Bernard left Cairo for Venice in March, accompanied by Andrée, Irène and Antoine. He returned to Cairo in October to definitely separate from Hannénah and went back to France, taking both children with him.
- 1904: On the way to Paris, Bernard stopped for a visit at Cézanne's place in Aix-en-Provence, then decided to establish his more-or-less permanent home in Tonnerre-sur-Yonne (Bourgogne), whilst spending the winter in Naples.
- 1905—1912: On return from Naples, Bernard met Cézanne again. La Rénovation esthétique was founded to propagate increasingly reactionary Catholic points of view. He from now mostly travelled between Paris and Tonnerre and produced a vast output of art critic's essays, poems, plays, book illustrations, but also paintings (towards 1910, mainly landscapes). Around 1907, he visited Andries Bonger in the Netherlands and portrayed him and his wife. In 1908, he exposed three of his paintings at the Post-Impressionist exhibition in Prague, having been invited by Milos Marten, who admired his art. In 1910, he had a whole room in the Musée Baudouin (Paris) to exhibit his Orientalist work. At that time, working on his career, he was hardly concerned about Andrée and the children. In December 1911, heirship after his father's death allowed him a better life.

== 1910s ==
- 1910: Bernard's friend Eugène Boch moves to his new house Villa La Grimpette in Monthyon - Émile Bernard becomes a fréquent guest to this house.
- 1913—1921: Bernard showed some of his woodcuts at the Circle des librairies, in 1913. Having fallen in love with Armenian Armène Ohanian, he lived with her in Villeneuve-les-Avignon for three years, where he decorated the church with frescoes. Besides, created woodcuts for Les Amours de Ronsard, Les Fleurs du mal, and François Villon. After Armène had left him, he stayed in Tonnerre until the end of the war; in 1919, returned to Paris and lived with one Mme Duchâteau and Irène.

== 1920s ==
- 1922-1925: Stayed in Italy, where he was well respected: Exhibited at the 1922 Venice Biennale and at the 1923 Rome Biennale. Major paintings created during that period were Le Christ guérissant les malades, Les Héros et les dieux, Le Doute, La Construction du temple. Le Cycle humain is to be mentioned.
- 1927: Having left Italy by the end of 1925, he travelled the Loire Valley, gave lectures and organized conferences on art.

== 1930s ==
- 1937: death of his wife Hannénah
- 1938: Bernard marries Andrée Fort, but prefers living alone in Pont-Aven until 1940.

== 1940s ==
- 1941, April 16: Bernard dies in his studio at 15, quai Bourbon in Paris; Maurice Denis delivered an oration, following his funeral at Île-Saint-Louis.

== Resources ==
=== References ===
- Russell T. Clement, Annick Houzé, Christiane Erbolato-Ramsey: A Sourcebook of Gauguin's Symbolist Followers: Les Nabis; ISBN 978-0-313-31205-2 (941 pages); Greenwood Publishing Group, 2004
- MaryAnne Stevens, ed.: Émile Bernard 1868-1941: A Pioneer of Modern Art / Ein Wegbereiter der Moderne, Waanders, Zwolle, 1990 ISBN 90-6630-130-9 (German & English)
