= Sonneries =

Sonneries may refer to:

- The plural of sonnerie, French for ringing, especially in a bell tower or clock
- Sonneries de la Rose+Croix, a piano composition by Erik Satie
