= Cloisonnism =

Style of post-Impressionist painting

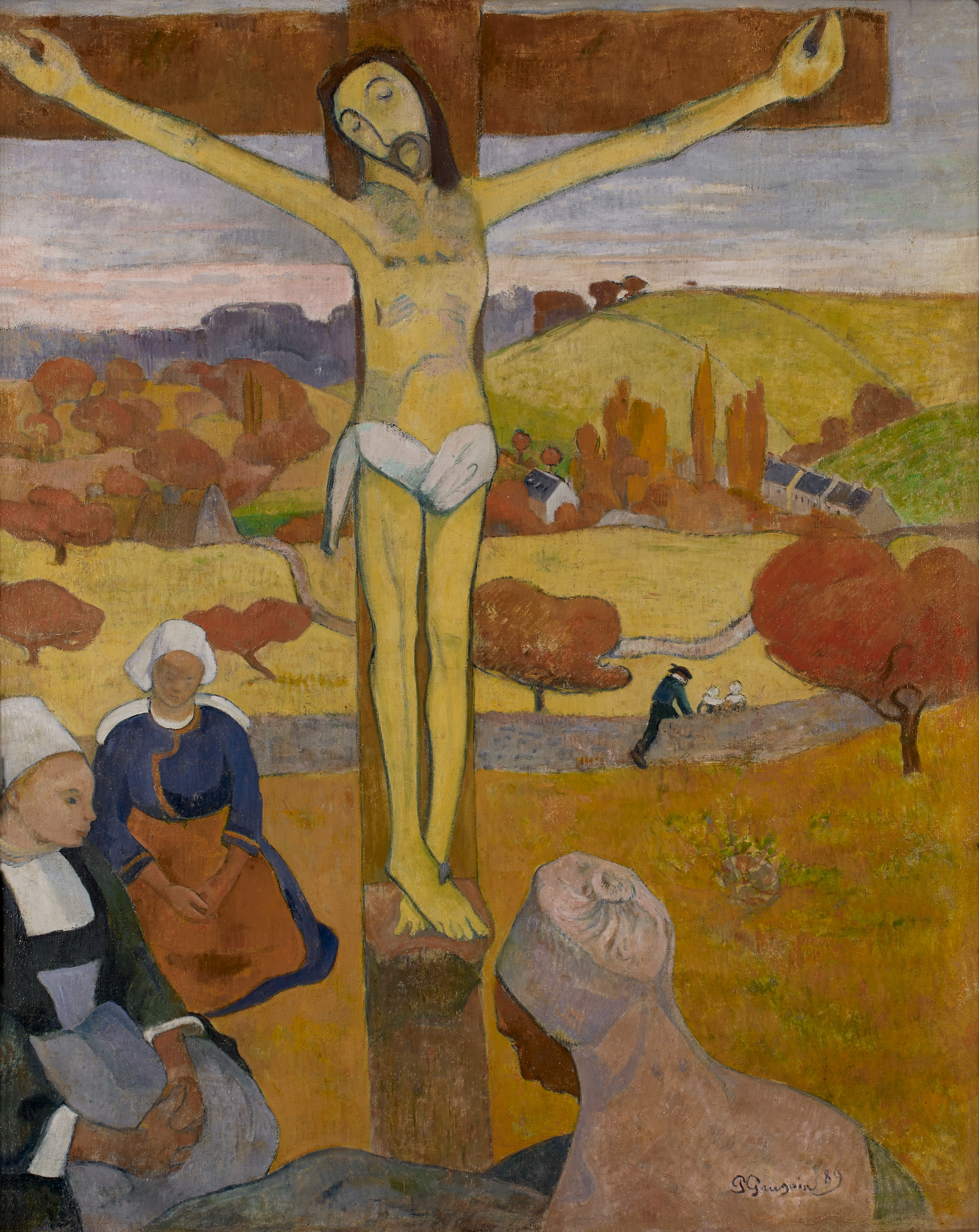
Paul Gauguin, The Yellow Christ (Le Christ jaune), 1889

Cloisonnism is a style of post-Impressionist painting with bold and flat forms separated by dark contours. The term was coined by critic Édouard Dujardin on the occasion of the Salon des Indépendants, in March 1888. Artists Émile Bernard, Louis Anquetin, Paul Gauguin, Paul Sérusier, and others started painting in this style in the late 19th century. The name evokes the technique of cloisonné, where wires (cloisons or "compartments") are soldered to the body of the piece, filled with powdered glass, and then fired. Many of the same painters also described their works as Synthetism, a closely related movement.

In The Yellow Christ (1889), often cited as a quintessential cloisonnist work, Gauguin reduced the image to areas of single colors separated by heavy black outlines. In such works he paid little attention to classical perspective and eliminated subtle gradations of color—two of the most characteristic principles of post-Renaissance painting.

The cloisonnist separation of colors reflects an appreciation for discontinuity that is characteristic of Modernism.

== France ==
The Movement of Cloisonnism emerged in france and became closely associated with the Pont-Aven school and the work of Paul Gauguin. Cloisonnism was seen as a reaction to Impressionism by emphasizing structure, symbolism and decorative qualities over the realistic depiction of fleeting visual effects.

=== Paul Gauguin ===
It was Gauguin who used the word Synthetism, by which he meant a style of art in which the form (color planes and lines) is synthesized with the major idea or feeling of the subject. Although he had exhibited with the Impressionists until 1886, he did not share their disregard for defined forms or compositional elements. He felt that their preoccupation with the study of light effects in nature was confining, superficial, and neglectful of thought and ideas. He sought to develop a new decorative style in art based on areas of pure color (e.g., without shaded areas or modeling), a few strong lines, and an almost two-dimensional arrangement of parts. He spent the summers of 1886 and 1888 in Pont-Aven and Le Pouldu, Brittany, France, with Bernard and other disciples, where he founded the Synthetist group.

== The Japanese Influence ==
Japanese woodblocks prints have a contribution in the development of Cloisonnist artist. The movement adopted many visual elements like the flattened space, bold contour lines asymmetric composition as expressed in ukiyo-e prints. These elements contributed to the appearance of the Cloisonnism style, it also reflects the broader European interest in Japonisme during the late 19th century.

== Importance of Cloisonnism ==
Cloisonnism was an art movement which helped pushing painting away from naturalism and towards greater abstraction and symbolism. Emile Bernard and Louis Anquetin are standout figues in cloisonnism. Technically, it broke the tradition of shading and perspective, emphasizing emotional expression over realistic representation. This shift later caused more popular movements such as symbolism and even early modernism, particularly Fauvism, which expanded on its use of vivid, non-naturalistic color. By rejecting strict realism, cloisonnism helped redefine what painting could communicate, prioritize mood and design over the limitation of the visible world.

== Gallery ==
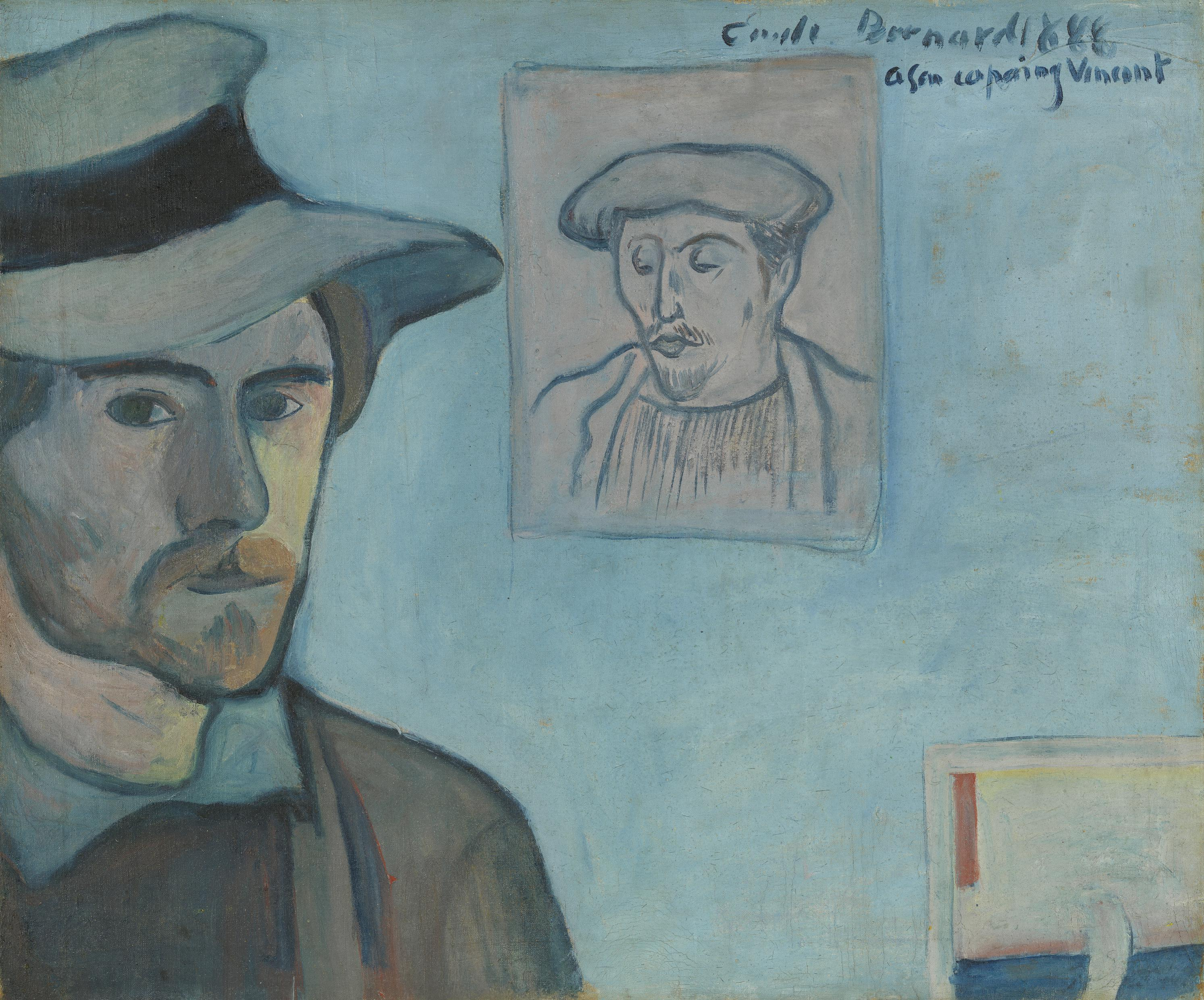
Émile Bernard Self-portrait with portrait of Gauguin, dedicated to Vincent van Gogh. (1888)

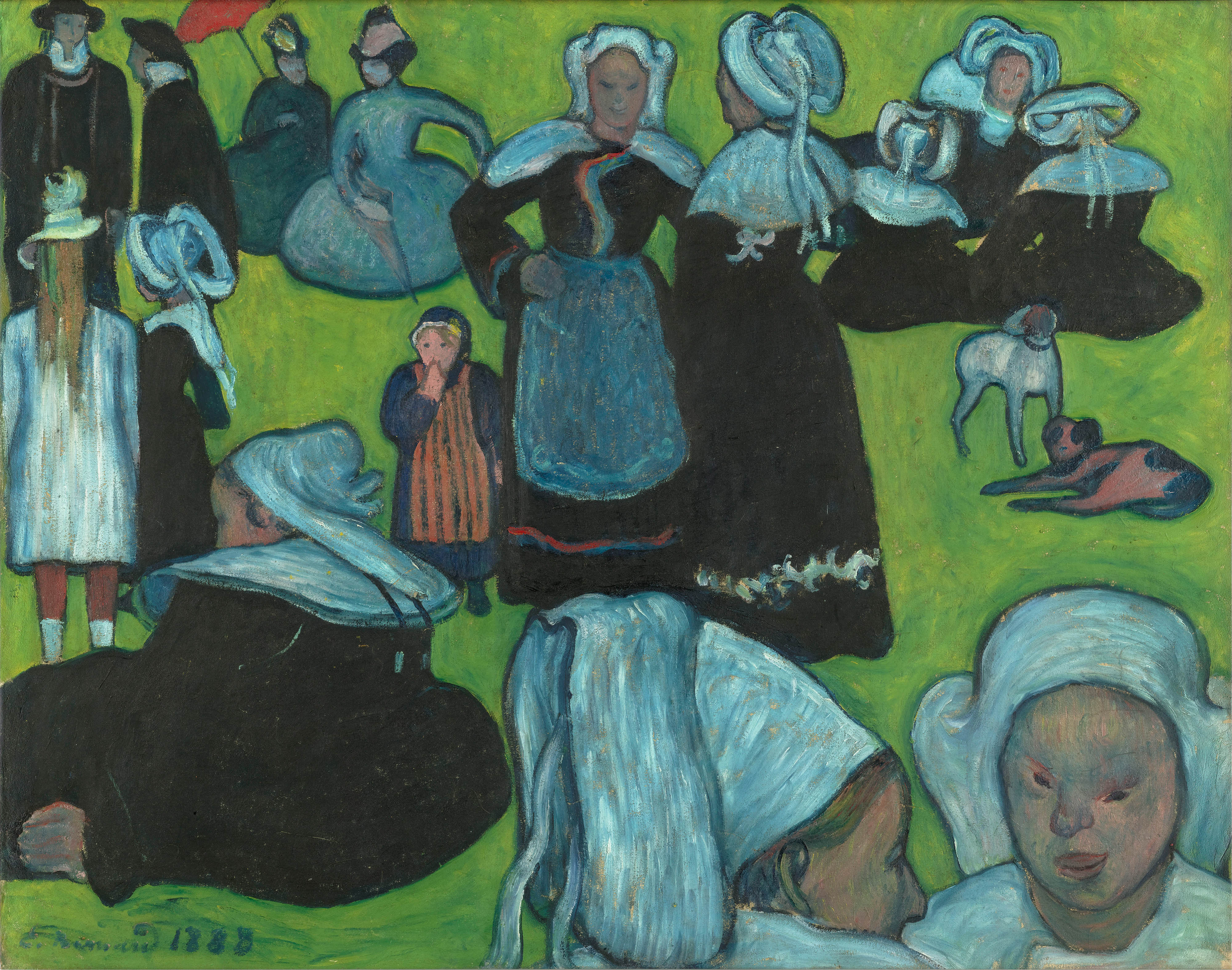
Émile Bernard, The Pardon (August 1888)

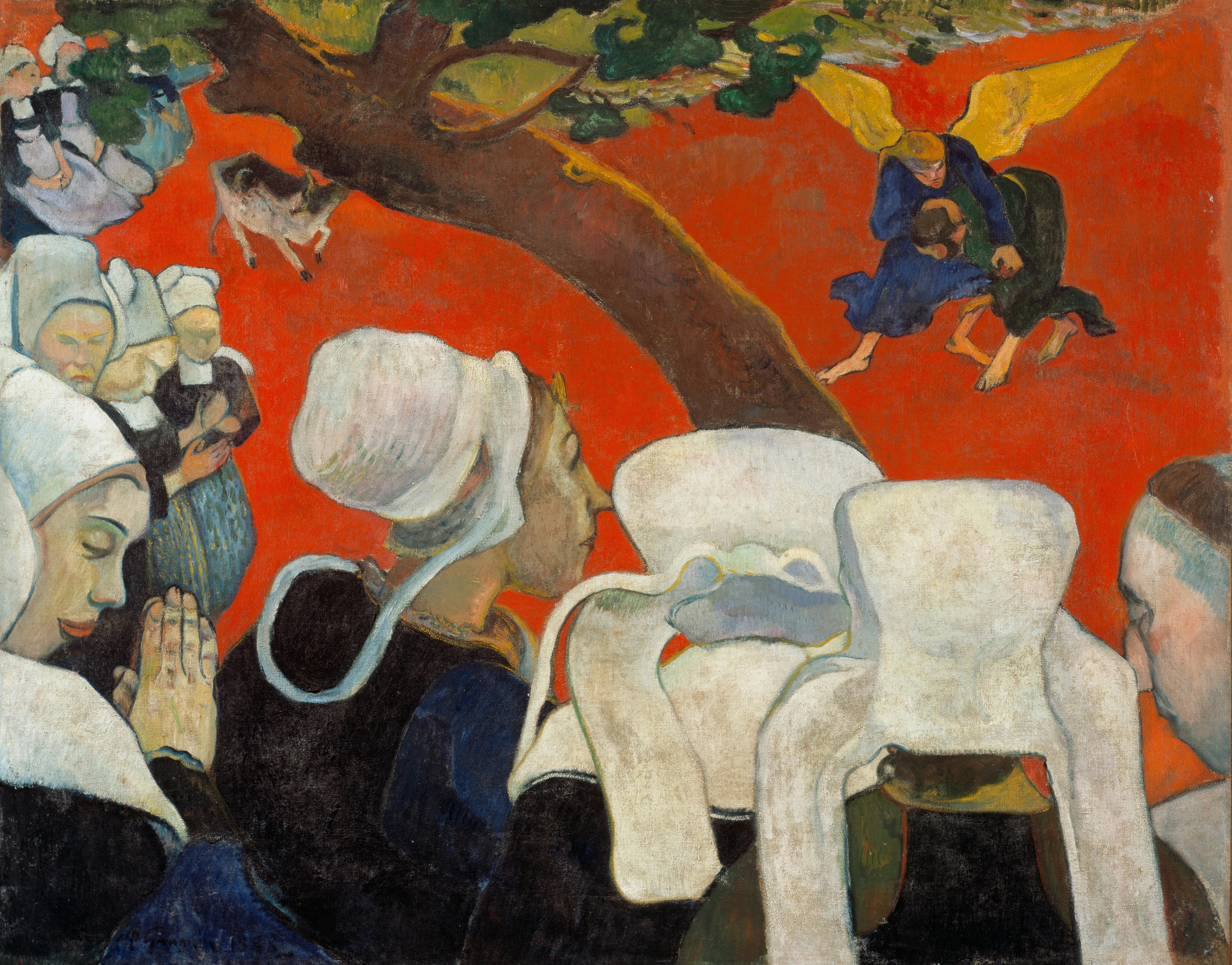
Paul Gauguin, Vision after the Sermon (1888)

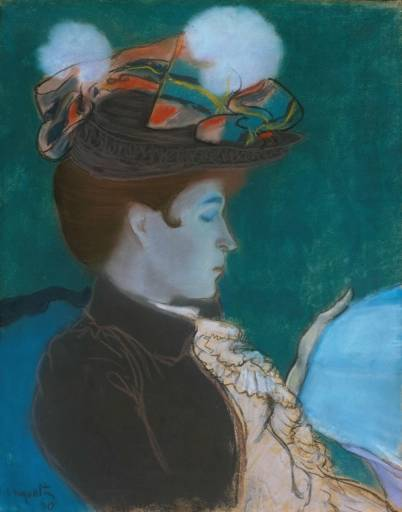
Louis Anquetin, Reading Woman (1890)

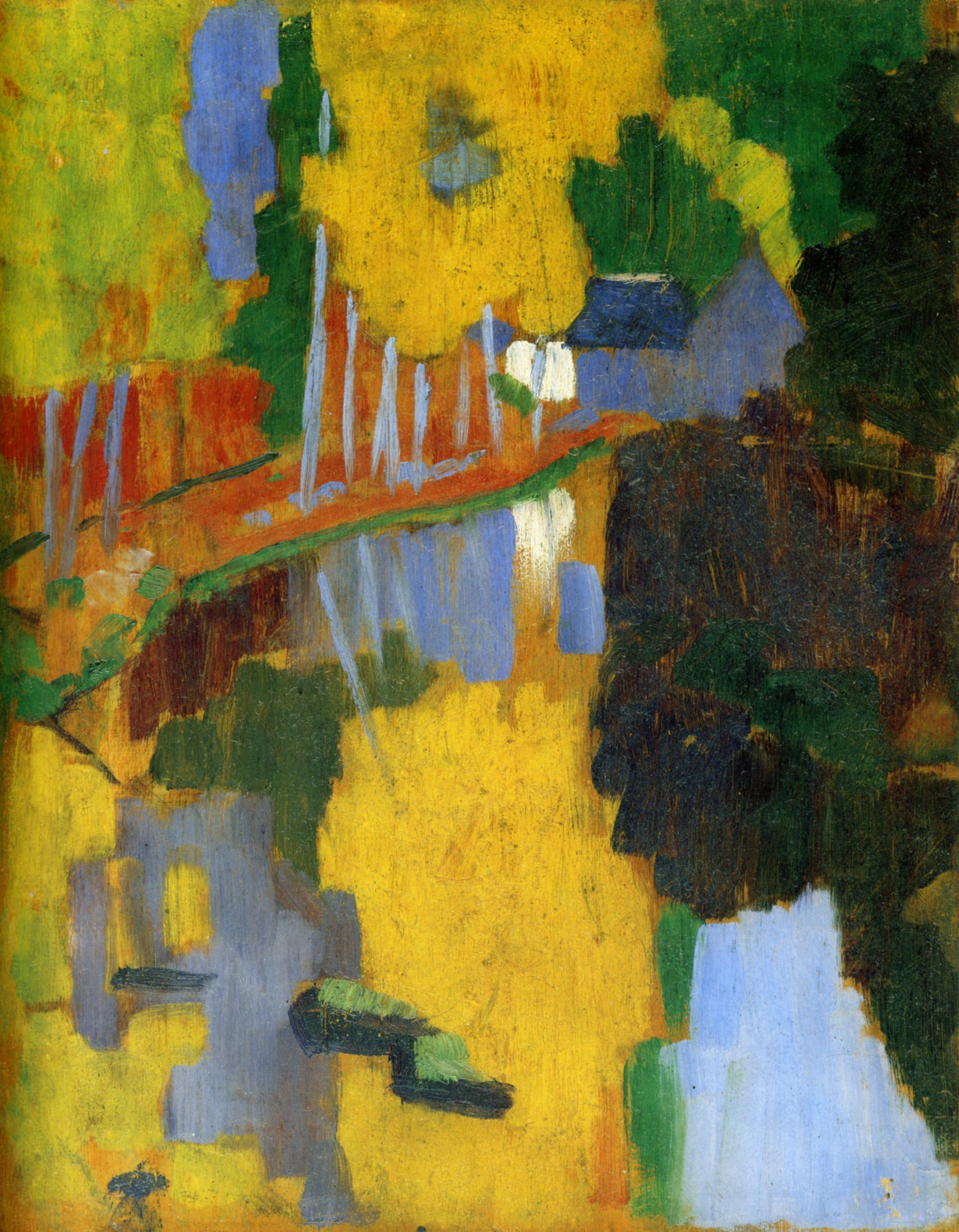
Paul Sérusier, The Talisman/Le Talisman, (1888)

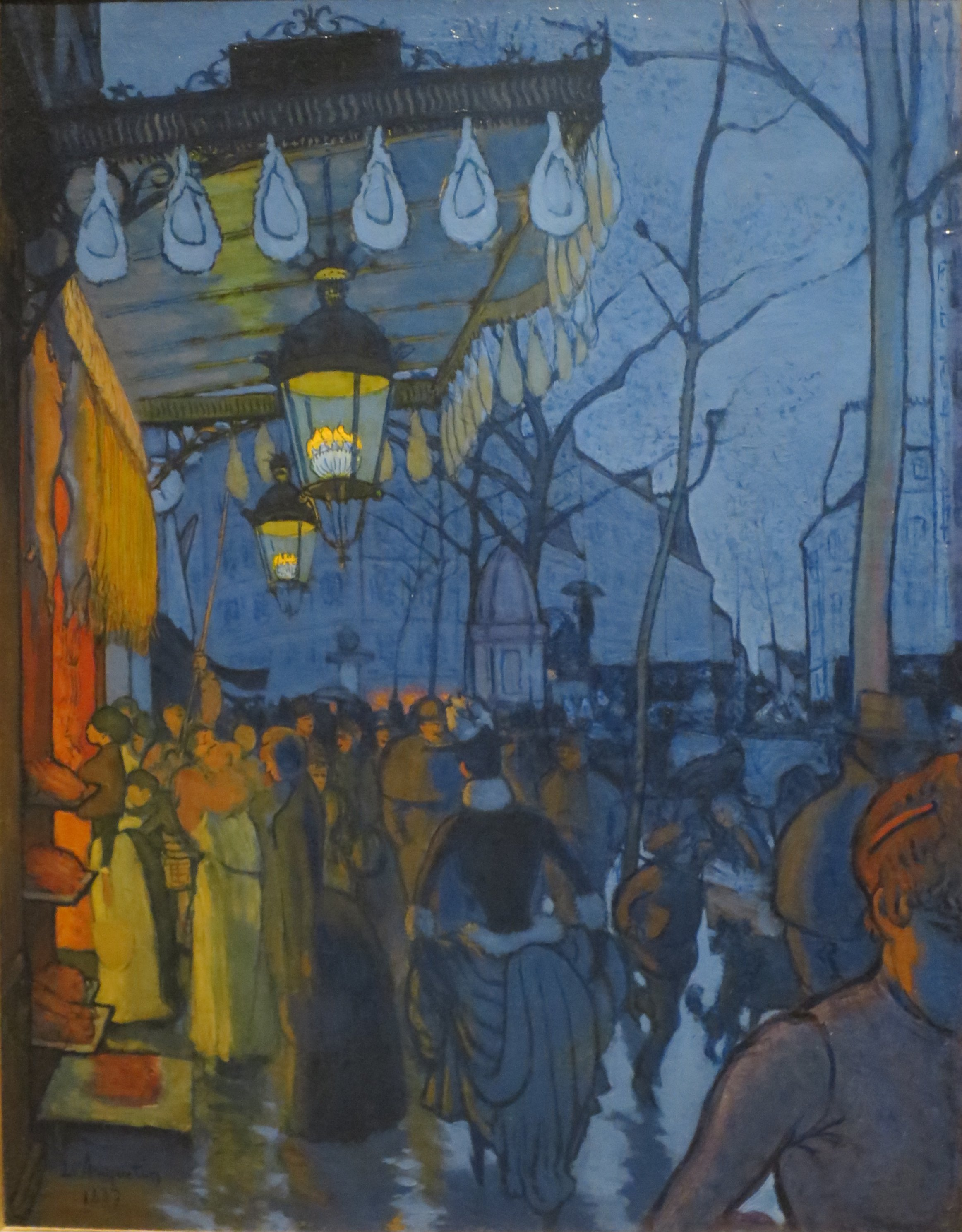
Louis Anquetin, Avenue de Clichy, Five O'Clock in the Evening

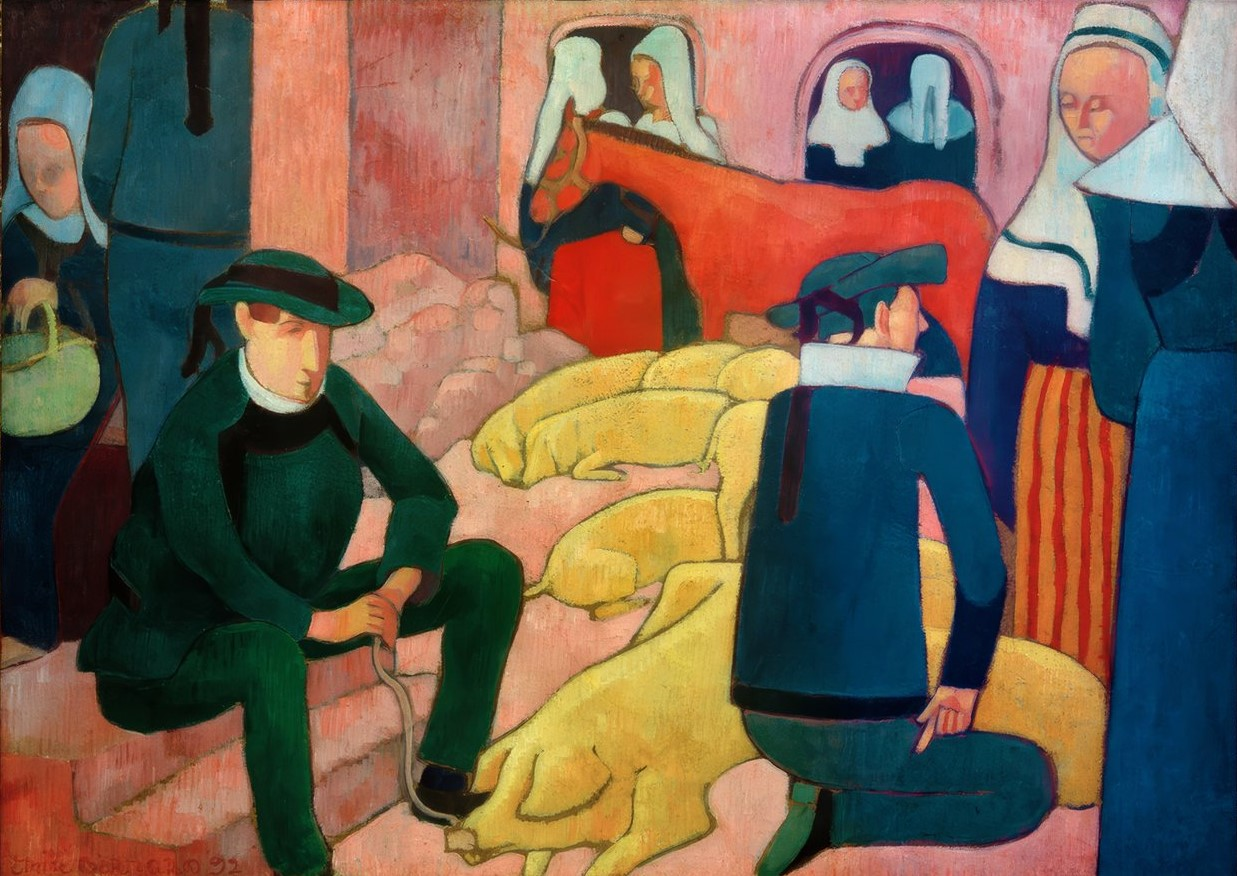
Émile Bernard, Le marche aux cochons (1892)

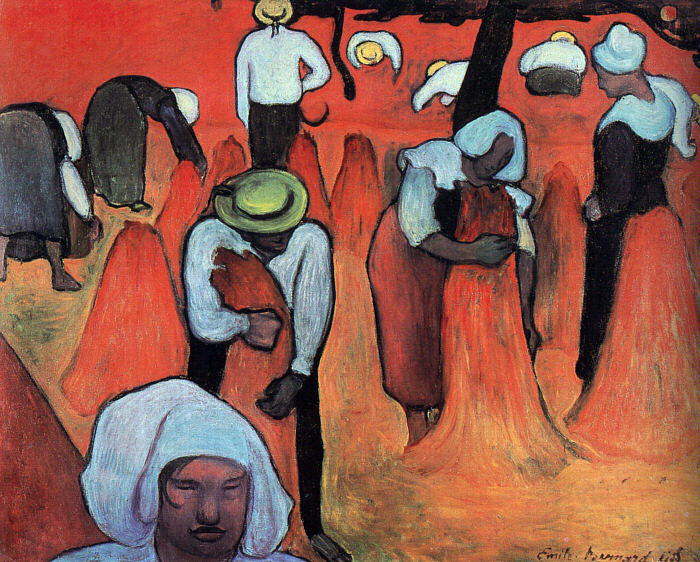
Émile Bernard, Buckwheat Harvesters (1888)

== See also ==
- Émile Bernard chronology
- The Volpini Exhibition, 1889
