= Antoine de La Rochefoucauld (artist) =

French painter

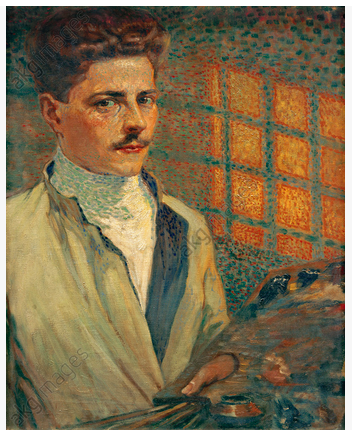
- Antoine de La Rochefoucauld, painter, by Emile Schuffenecker, oil on canvas, 69.5 × 56 cm. Amsterdam, Van Gogh Museum.
- Born: 10 October 1862; Paris, France
- Died: 8 September 1959 (aged 96); Menilles, France
- Occupations: Artist, patron and art collector

Count (Comte) Antoine de La Rochefoucauld (10 October 1862 – 8 September 1959) was an artist, patron and art collector as well as a proponent of Rosicrucianism in France at the end of the 19th century.

== Life ==
Marie Joseph Auguste Antoine de La Rochefoucauld was the fourth and youngest son of Count Alfred de La Rochefoucauld, 1st Duke of La Roche-Guyon, (1819–1883) and Isabelle Nivière (1833–1911), married since 1851. Born in Paris, 10 October 1862, Antoine first served in the army as an officer, but retired to become a painter. 23 June 1900 he married Eugenie Dubois (14 May 1862, Paris – 19 July 1936, Chateau de La Grand'Cour), daughter of Felix Dubois and Victorine Anfray. The couple had two children, Emmanuel (1898–1936) and Eugène (1901–1987).After the death of his wife, following the death of his first-born (12 June 1936) within a month at the same place, Antoine de La Rochefoucauld retired to Menilles, where he died 8 September 1959.

=== Ancestry ===
The House de La Rochefoucauld is one of the most famous families of French nobility, whose origins date back to the first Foucauld residing on the rock (de la Roche), with official evidence of nobility in 1019 and since the 13th century known as La Rochefoucauld (in the Charente département).

Antoine was born into a cadet branch of the Dukes de La Rochefoucauld, the Dukes de La Roche-Guyon - a title inherited by the first born in the male line only.

== Patron ==
De La Rochefoucauld financially supported Rosicrucian salons in Paris in the 1890s and was Grand Prior of the movement from 1892 to 1897. These salons were a focal point for mystical studies and promoted the idea of gestes esthétiques, a synthesis of the visual arts, literature and music. The third of Erik Satie's Sonneries de la Rose+Croix was composed in his honor.

Being the major sponsor of Émile Bernard, he considerably influenced this artist's spiritual development.

== Collector ==
According to a Christie's sale catalogue, in the early 1890s Antoine de La Rochefoucauld was the owner of Vincent van Gogh's Still Life: Vase with Fifteen Sunflowers which Japanese insurance magnate Yasuo Goto paid the equivalent of just under USD $40 million in 1987, at the time a record-setting amount for a van Gogh.

He was also the previous owner of La Berceuse, a van Gogh now in the Museum of Fine Arts, Boston.

== See also ==
- Gnossiennes

== Resources ==
=== References ===
- Robert A. Pincus-Witten, Occult Symbolism in France: Jose'phin Peladan and the Salons de la Rose-Croix, Garland, New York, 1976
- Sophie Monneret, L'impressionisme et son époque, dictionnaire international, Denoël, Paris 1979, pp. 413–414 ISBN 2-221-05222-6
