= Gestes esthétiques =

The term gestes esthétiques ("epic aesthetics") refers to a quasi-mystical synthesis of the visual arts, literature and music. The term has its origins in the Rosicrucian salons of Paris in the late 19th century. Sonneries de la Rose+Croix is a product of this artistic environment.
