= Sonnerie =

Sounds produced by bells

Sonnerie (French for 'making sound' or 'ring') generally applies to bell towers or bells in mechanical clocks or wristwatches (see for example grande sonnerie), but can equally be used, for example, for the sound produced by a telephone.

Sonnerie watches are revered by connoisseurs for chiming the time on tiny gongs on the hour and the quarter "in passing", and require highly skilled watchmakers as they "cannot be made satisfactorily through purely industrial means."

When "Sonnerie" is used as the name of a musical composition, it bears connotations of:

- Sounds produced by bell towers, for example Marin Marais's Sonnerie de Sainte-Geneviève du Mont de Paris (1723), Carillon from Bizet's L'Arlésienne or Cole Porter's I Happen to Like New York – all three of which rely on a repeated three-note figure to convey the peal of church bells, funeral bells or ship bells.
- Sounds produced by the bells of alarm clocks or trumpets sounding a réveil, for example Erik Satie's Sonnerie pour réveiller le bon gros Roi des Singes (lequel ne dort toujours que d'un oeil) (1921).
- Outdoor music, for example performed by horns before a hunt, or a serenade performed in honour of a special person.
- Any combination of the previous associations, for example Erik Satie's Sonneries de la Rose+Croix (1892).
