= Vision After the Sermon =

1888 painting by Paul Gauguin

Vision after the Sermon
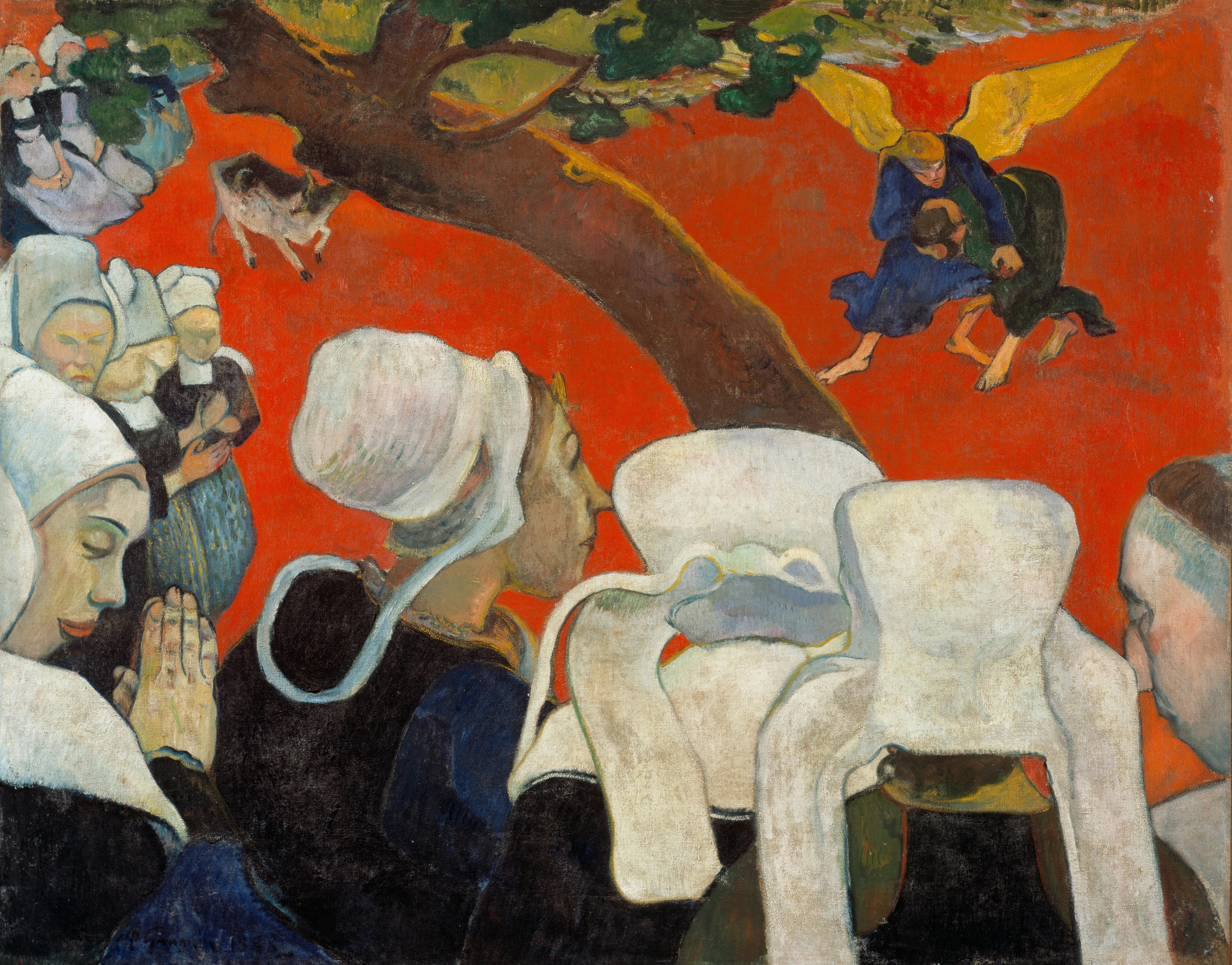
- Artist: Paul Gauguin
- Year: 1888
- Medium: Oil on canvas
- Dimensions: 72.2 cm × 91 cm (28.4 in × 35.8 in)
- Location: Scottish National Gallery, Edinburgh

Vision after the Sermon (Jacob Wrestling with the Angel) is an oil painting by French artist Paul Gauguin, completed in 1888. It is now in the Scottish National Gallery, Edinburgh. It depicts a scene from the Bible in which Jacob wrestles an angel. It depicts this indirectly, through a vision that the women depicted see after a sermon in church. It was painted in Pont-Aven, Brittany, France.

== Background ==
In the early part of his career as a painter, Gauguin had painted primarily landscapes en plein air in the Impressionist manner. By 1888, he had become dissatisfied with Impressionism, which did not satisfy his enthusiasm for archaic and primitive forms or his interest in the mystical. In 1888, during a visit to the artist's colony of Pont-Aven in Brittany, he met the young artist Émile Bernard, who had begun painting in a simplified style influenced by Japanese prints. Following Bernard's example but developing it further, Gauguin painted Vision After the Sermon, which marked his interest in interpreting religious subject matter in a highly personal way. He became recognized as the leader of a new style called Synthetism.

== Composition and technique ==
The use of color, shape, and line in Vision After the Sermon is appreciated for its bold manner of handling paint. Finding inspiration in Japanese woodblock prints from Hiroshige and Hokusai, which he owned, Gauguin developed the idea of non-naturalistic landscapes. He applies large areas of flat color to the composition, and the red ground departs from the conventional representation of earth, field, or grass. In portraying the watching figures Gauguin experiments with the distortion of shapes, exaggerating features, and use of strong contour lines rather than gradual shifts in tone that most painters practiced. The brown trunk, black garments, white hats, and red field are painted with minimal color shading. Gauguin is showing it is possible to move away from naturalism towards a more abstract, even symbolic, manner of painting. While formal elements of Gauguin's paintings reflect the influence of Japanese prints, his choice of subject matter and composition are uniquely his own.

Gauguin structures the painting by placing a tree trunk diagonally through its center. By sectioning the image this way, he creates a visual separation between the Breton women and their vision of an angel wrestling with Jacob. This compositional decision is developed to frame the main subjects of the painting. The curve of the trunk follows the line of the head of the center-most figure. The branches and leaves shoot out directly toward the upper right corner of the painting to form a second frame around the angel and Jacob. The overall perspective of this painting is purposely skewed but effectively accomplished by his clustering of people in diminished sizes along its left edge.

"Further, it was Emile Bernard who pointed out the general influence of Japanese prints on Gauguin’s work. This seems self-evident when one compares Gauguin’s Vision after the Sermon to Vincent van Gogh’s Trees, a copy after Hiroshige, with its diagonally placed tree and use of red. In citing Hokusai’s Sumo wrestlers in The Manga, however, Bernard was being more specific. He designated them as the source of Gauguin’s struggling angel and Jacob". One can see their features, in the faces, of the women that are closer to the viewer. The tale of Jacob wrestling an angel is from Genesis 32:22-31 in the Old Testament. Gauguin is making use of Breton themes while at the same time leaning towards abstraction. The women, one of whom clasps her hands in prayer, are wearing a variety of white hats (coiffes) and seem to be the ones having this vision. Several colors stand out above the rest, including the reds, black, and white, and contribute to the visual energy of the scene. The color most likely to catch the viewer's attention first in this painting would be red, which in this particular painting lends power to the struggle that is occurring.

== See also ==
- List of paintings by Paul Gauguin
