= Sonneries de la Rose+Croix =

Composition by Erik Satie

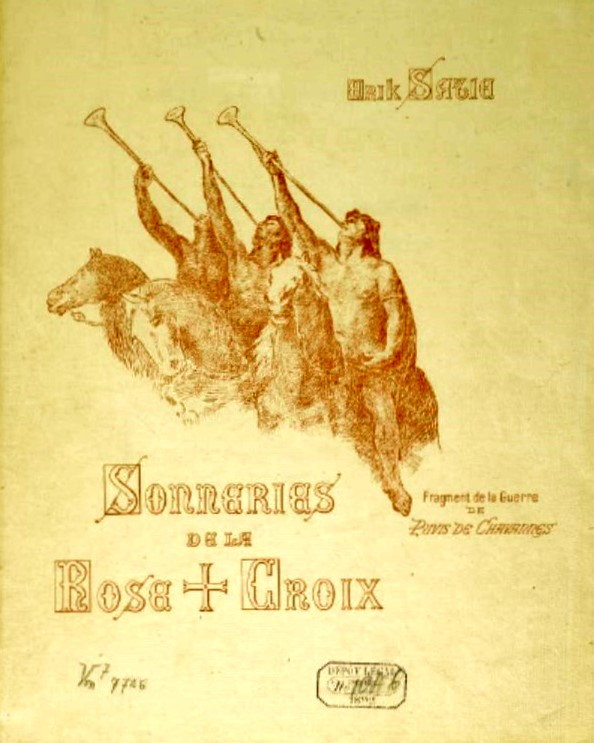
Original edition of Satie's score for the Sonneries de la Rose + Croix (1892)

Trois Sonneries de la Rose+Croix ('Three Sonneries of the Rose+Cross') is a piano composition by Erik Satie, first published in 1892, while he was composer and chapel-master of the Rosicrucian Ordre de la Rose-Croix Catholique, du Temple et du Graal, led by Sâr Joséphin Péladan.

Other ways of transcribing the title of this work include Sonneries de la Rose + Croix, Trois sonneries de la Rose-Croix and Sonneries de la Rose†Croix.

The composition has three movements, totalling about 11 minutes execution time:

1. Air de l'Ordre ('Air of the Order')
2. Air du Grand Maître ('Air of the Grand-Master', i.e. Sâr Péladan)
3. Air du Grand Prieur ('Air of the Grand-Prior', i.e. Count Antoine de La Rochefoucauld)

A composition dated 20 January 1891, having only Modéré (Moderato) marked on the score, is generally known as Première pensée Rose+Croix, after its first publication in 1968.

The three sections are written with no bar lines, implying a free metric structure. Each piece is written in an elegant melody/accompaniment chorale style, exhibiting an interplay of two themes in austere but cleverly designed juxtaposition, with repetition and occasional departure from the initial exposition. In 1988, Alan Gillmor of Carleton University, Ottawa, Ontario, published his Erik Satie. Here was revealed his finding that, in all three movements, the ratios of beat counts of these complementary sections within all three pieces fell close enough to the Golden ratio as to evade mistaking for anything but design intent by the composer. Dr. Gillmor was led to explore this by research which suggested that, around the time of the composition of the Sonneries, Satie and Debussy had discussed the possibilities for using the Golden ratio in their work.
