= Agee (surname) =

Agee is a surname. Notable people with the surname include:

- Alfred W. Agee (1850–1938), American lieutenant governor of Nebraska
- Ann Agee (born 1959), American visual artist
- Arthur Agee (born 1972), American basketball player and subject of the documentary Hoop Dreams
- Bob Agee, American university president
- Chris Agee (born 1956), Irish/American poet
- Evelyn Turrentine-Agee (born 1946), American gospel musician
- G. Steven Agee (born 1952), American judge
- James Agee (1909–1955), American novelist, poet, critic and screenwriter
- Joel Agee (born 1940), American writer and translator, son of James Agee
- Jon Agee (born 1960), American children's book writer and illustrator
- Jonis Agee (born 1943), American academic and writer
- Lynne Agee (born 1948), American basketball coach
- Margaret Agee, New Zealand counselling academic
- Mary Cunningham Agee (born 1951), American business executive and author
- Mel Agee (1968–2008), American football player
- Mike Agee (1938–1990), American football player and coach
- Nancy Agee (born 1955), American businesswoman
- Philip Agee (1935–2008), CIA employee and author
- Rashaun Agee (born 2000), American college basketball player
- Ray Agee (1921–1989), American R&B singer and songwriter
- Sam Agee (1915–2006), American football player
- Sarah Agee (born 1946), American politician
- Steve Agee (born 1969), American actor
- Tajuan Agee (born 1997), American basketball player
- Tawatha Agee (born 1954), American singer and songwriter
- Tommie Agee (1942–2001), American baseball player
- Tommie Agee (American football) (born 1964), American football player
- Whitney Marie Agee, married name Whitney Agee Hollman, American cheerleader
- William Agee (athlete) (1905–1954), American long-distance runner
- William Agee (1938–2017), American business executive
- William C. Agee (1936–2022), American curator and art historian
- Evelyn Turrentine-Agee (born 1946), American gospel musician and artist
