= Jonis =

Jonis is a unisex given name. Notable people with the name include:

- Jonis Agee, American professor and writer
- Jonis Bascir (born 1960), Somali-Italian actor and musician
- Jonis Khoris (born 1989), Italian football midfielder and forward
