= AG =

A&G, AG, Ag or ag may refer to:

== Businesses and organizations ==
- A&G Railroad, the former Abbeville–Grimes Railway
- Action Group (Nigeria), a political party during the Nigerian First Republic
- Aktiengesellschaft, a German word for a type of corporation
- All Gamers, a Chinese esports organization
- Assemblies of God, the world's largest Pentecostal organization
- Associated Group, a Pakistani company
- Astronomische Gesellschaft, a German astronomical society
- Aruba Airlines (IATA code AG)
- Australian Greens, a political party
- First Majestic Silver (NYSE stock ticker AG)

== Entertainment ==
- American Gladiators (1989 TV series) (1989–1996 TV series)
- American Gladiators (2008 TV series)
- Atarashii Gakko!, a Japanese girl group

== Government and military ==
- Aerographer's mate, a rating or specialty in the US Navy that deals with weather and oceanography
- American Holland-class submarine (Amerikansky Golland), a class of Imperial Russian submarines
- Army green, the color of the US Army service uniform and those of several other militaries
- Miscellaneous ship, a US Navy hull classification symbol
- Administrator-General of South West Africa, the head of government in Namibia prior to independence in 1990
- Adjutant general, the Army branch responsible for personnel
- Attorney general, a government lawyer or law enforcement officer in several legal systems

== People ==
- Aaron Gordon (born 1995), American basketball player
- Adrianne Gonzalez (born 1977), American musician who goes by the stage name AG
- Adriano Goldschmied (born 1944), Italian fashion designer
- A. G. Cook (born 1990), British pop music producer
- A. G. Weinberger, Romanian musician and singer/songwriter
- Alex Gonzaga (born 1988), Filipina singer who sometimes uses the abbreviated nickname AG
- Ariana Grande (born 1993), American musician
- Aurela Gaçe (born 1974), Albanian singer
- Showbiz and A.G., a hip-hop duo from The Bronx (short for "André the Giant")

== Places ==
- .ag, the ccTLD for Antigua and Barbuda
- Aargau, a Swiss canton
- Ág, a village in Hungary
- Algeria, FIPS country code
- Province of Agrigento, a Province of Italy (ISO 3166-2:IT code AG)
- Antigua and Barbuda, a twin-island nation lying between the Caribbean Sea and the Atlantic Ocean
- Argentina, WMO country code
- Argeș County, a county in Romania (ISO 3166-2:RO code AG)

== Science and technology ==
- Silver, symbol Ag, a chemical element
- Agamous, a gene which plays a role in the ABC model of flower development
- Allocation group, a sub-volume in a computer file system
- Anion gap, a value calculated from the results of several medical tests
- Antigen, a substance that stimulates an immune response
- Astronomische Gesellschaft, a German astronomical society
- Attogram, an SI derived unit of mass
- Attribute grammar, in formal language theory
- Inequality of arithmetic and geometric means, in mathematics
- American Holland-class submarine (Amerikansky Golland), a class of Imperial Russian submarines

== Other uses ==
- Anno Graecorum, the Seleucid era, an ancient calendar
- Atuagagdliutit/Grønlandsposten, a newspaper in Greenland
- AG, dominical letter of a leap year starting on Sunday
- Akzidenz-Grotesk, typeface
- Kediri, Blitar, Tulungagung, Nganjuk and Trenggalek (vehicle registration prefix AG)
- Ashgabat (vehicle registration suffix AG)

== See also ==
- Agee (disambiguation)
