= Agee =

Agee may refer to:

- Agee (surname), including a list of people with the surname
- Agee (film), a 1980 documentary film
- Agee Creek, a stream in Missouri
- Agee (biblical figure), a minor biblical character
- Agee (bear), a polar bear who appeared in films

== See also ==
- Gee (surname)
- AG (disambiguation)
