= Karen Wilkin =

American art critic

Karen Wilkin (born 1940) is a New York–based independent curator and art critic specializing in 20th-century modernism.

== Biography ==
Educated at Barnard College and Columbia University, she was awarded a Woodrow Wilson Fellowship and a Fulbright Scholarship to Rome. Wilkin has organized numerous exhibitions internationally and is the author of monographs on Stuart Davis, David Smith, Anthony Caro, Kenneth Noland, Helen Frankenthaler, and Hans Hofmann. Her projects include a Hofmann retrospective for the Naples Art Museum in Naples, Florida, and, with William C. Agee, the introductory essays for Stuart Davis: A Catalogue Raisonné.

Wilkin met Clement Greenberg in the early 1970s. When the Portland Art Museum in Oregon acquired the critic’s collection, she was asked to contribute the main essay to the catalogue, because of her long friendship with Greenberg and her expertise on his writings, his studio practices, and the artists with whom he was closely associated. She was curator of the Company Gallery exhibition “The Mirror Eye: Clement Greenberg in Syracuse” that examines some of the Syracuse painters influenced by Greenberg. In 2009 Wilkin curated a posthumous retrospective of the painter Cleve Gray at the Boca Raton Museum of Art.

Wilkin is the atelier head of art history at the New York Studio School. She is the contributing editor for art for The Hudson Review, an advisory editor for The Hopkins Review, and a regular contributor to The New Criterion and The Wall Street Journal.

== Selected publications ==
- 1978 - Modern Painting in Canada (with Terry Fenton) (ISBN 0-88830-162-6)
- 1984 – David Smith (Modern Masters Series) (ISBN 1-55859-256-3)
- 1986 – Milton Avery: Paintings of Canada (ISBN 0-88911-403-X)
- 1992 – Georges Braque (Modern Masters Series) (ISBN 0-89659-947-7)
- 1995 – Frankenthaler: Works on Paper 1949-1984 (ISBN 0-8076-1104-2)
- 1998 – Giorgio Morandi (Twentieth-Century Masters Series) (ISBN 0-8478-1947-7)
- 1998 – Isaac Witkin (ISBN 1-55595-153-8)
- 1999 – Stuart Davis in Gloucester (ISBN 1-889097-34-9)
- 2000 – David Smith: Two into Three Dimensions (ISBN 1-886438-01-3)
- 2001 – Clement Greenberg: A Critic's Collection (with Bruce Guenther) (ISBN 0-691-09049-1)
- 2003 – Hans Hofmann (ISBN 0-8076-1526-9)
- 2005 – Kenneth Noland: The Nature of Color (with Alison de Lima Greene) (ISBN 0-89090-130-9)
- 2007 – Stuart Davis: A Catalogue Raisonné (3 volumes) (with William C. Agee, edited by Ani Boyajian and Mark Rutkoski) (ISBN 0-300-10981-4)
- 2007 – Color As Field:American Painting, 1950-1975 (with Carl Belz) (ISBN 978-0-300-12023-3)
- 2007 – The Paintings of Cynthia Polsky (with John Yau) (ISBN 978-0-856-67628-4)
- 2015 – The Onward of Art: American Abstract Artists 80th Anniversary Exhibition (ISBN 978-0-9972072-0-0)
