= Newsweek Pakistan =

Pakistani news magazine, founded 2010

- Cover of November 2010 issue of Newsweek Pakistan
- Editor: Fasih Ahmed
- Consulting Editor: Khaled Ahmed
- Managing Editor: Jahanzeb Aslam
- Publisher: Iqbal Z. Ahmed
- Founded: 2010
- First issue: 5 September 2010; 16 years ago
- Final issue: 2020
- Company: AG Publications
- Country: Pakistan
- Based in: Lahore
- Language: English
- Website: www.newsweekpakistan.com
- ISSN: 2226-7492

Newsweek Pakistan was a news magazine published by AG Publications, under license from Newsweek Publishing LLC. It replaced the Asia Pacific edition, and carried reportage, analysis and opinion on Pakistan in addition to the content featured in the international edition.

Fasih Ahmed, who had reported for the Wall Street Journal, Newsweek and The Daily Beast, was appointed as the editor of Newsweek Pakistan. Ahmed won a New York Press Club award in 2008 for Newsweek’s coverage of the assassination of former Pakistani prime minister Benazir Bhutto.

== History ==
Newsweek Pakistan was founded in August 2010. The cover story on Newsweek Pakistan's first issue, "The World's Bravest Nation: Pakistan", showed a boy displaced by the 2010 Pakistan floods. The magazine donated net proceeds from the sale of this debut issue to the U.N.'s World Food Program.

The debut issue also featured an exclusive interview with Pakistani nuclear scientist Abdul Qadeer Khan, and also included an article on Pakistan by Ron Moreau, author of the October 2007 Newsweek cover story, "The Most Dangerous Nation in the World is not Iraq. It's Pakistan."

The magazine was produced by AG Publications under license from Newsweek Publishing LLC, and is edited by Fasih Ahmed who has written for The Wall Street Journal, Newsweek International, and who was the inaugural Daniel Pearl fellow. Ahmed also wrote the aforementioned debut issue cover story, which was also published online by Newsweek.

The magazine's coverage of the attack on schoolgirl activist Malala Yousafzai, reported by Shehrbano Taseer, was the cover story for the Pakistan edition as well as Newsweek's foreign editions.

On 2 April 2010, in Lahore, Newsweek Pakistan hosted an exclusive breakfast for Abdullah Gül, the then-President of the Republic of Turkey.

The magazine's advisory board comprises: Hameed Haroon, CEO of the Dawn Media Group; Qazi Shaukat Fareed, who has worked with the U.N. for over 20 years; Parvez Hassan, lawyer and environmentalist; Ayesha Jalal, professor of history at Tufts University; and David Walters, former governor of Oklahoma.

== International editions ==
In 2013, Newsweek Pakistan ran two licensed international print editions after Newsweek in the U.S. went digital. The Europe, Middle East and Africa (EMEA) and the Latin American editions, both in English, were produced in Pakistan and printed out of Germany and Brazil.

== Awards ==
Newsweek Pakistan's cover story on the challenges facing the country's polio vaccination campaign won a gold medal in 2013 at the United Nations Correspondents Association's Excellence in Journalism Awards. Benazir Shah was the principal reporter of the piece.
