= Evelyn Turrentine-Agee =

- Also known as: Evelyn Turrentine-Agee
- Born: Ruth Evelyn Tyler; February 4, 1946 (age 79); St. Louis, Missouri
- Origin: Detroit, Michigan
- Genres: CCM, gospel, traditional black gospel, urban contemporary gospel
- Occupations: Singer, songwriter
- Instruments: vocals, singer-songwriter
- Years active: 1992–present
- Labels: A&M, World Wide, Atlanta International, Light, WOS, Ophir, Shanachie

Evelyn Turrentine-Agee (born February 4, 1946, as Ruth Evelyn Tyler), is an American gospel musician and artist. She started her music career, in 1992, with the release of In God's Own Time by A&M Records. She has released eight more albums, since her first release, with an assortment of labels, which are World Wide Gospel, Atlanta International Records, Light Records, WOS Recordings, Ophir Gospel, Shanachie Records. Five albums have charted on the Billboard magazine charts, which have primarily come on the Gospel Albums chart.

== Early life ==
Turrentine-Agee was born Ruth Evelyn Tyler on February 4, 1946, in St. Louis, Missouri, She was born as the third sibling in an eighteen sibling household. Her father, Cleveland Tyler, was a minister in the church, and her mother is Ruthie Mae Tyler. She started singing on stage at the age of three because her father was in a quartet, and later they formed a family gospel girl group, The Tylerettes. She graduated high school by seventeen, and this enabled her to make her first record. Her education would not get forsaken because of her musical acumen and prowess because she graduated with a bachelor's degree in industrial psychology that she earned at the University of Detroit. Many gospel music groups tried to get her to join them, but her stay with them was rather brief because she had a strong desire for a solo music career.

== Music career ==
Her solo musical recording career started in 1992, with A&M Records releasing, In God's Own Time, and this was her Billboard magazine debut charting release on the Gospel Albums chart. She would go on to release eight more albums, and the four others to chart were the following: God Did It in 2000, It's Already Done in 2003, Go Through in 2005, Born to Worship in 2013.

== Personal life ==
While in college, she married Curtis Turrentine, and together they have survived her husband having alcoholism that he was delivered from in 1993, while she survived a stroke in 1997. They have 11 children and 40 grandchildren that are living.

== Discography ==
=== Studio albums ===
List of selected studio albums, with selected chart positions
Title	Album details	Peak chart positions
Title	Album details	US Gos
In God's Own Time	Released: 1992; Label: A&M; CD, digital download	31
God Did It!	Released: February 1. 2000; Label: World Wide; CD, digital download	28
It's Already Done	Released: March 4, 2003; Label: Atlanta International; CD, digital download	12
Go Through	Released: 2005; Label: Light; CD, digital download	50
Born to Worship	Released: 2013; Label: Ophir; CD, digital download	25
God Gave His Best	Released: 2018; Label: Asah Entertainment, Inc; digital download	
