= Iqbal Z. Ahmed =

Pakistani businessman

- Iqbal Z. Ahmed with Pakistan's former prime minister Benazir Bhutto
- Born: February 3, 1946 (age 79); Patna, India
- Occupation(s): Businessman, philanthropist

Iqbal Zafaruddin Ahmed (born 3 February 1946) is a Pakistani industrialist and philanthropist who is the founder of Associated Group. He is often referred to as the "gas king of Pakistan."

== Early life and education ==
Born in Patna, India, Ahmed is the son of Zohra (died 1979) and Z. Z. Ahmed (1910–1989), a former deputy inspector general of Pakistan Police. He was educated at Sadiq Public School and Aitchison College. Later, he earned a bachelor's degree in economics from Government College, Lahore, and a master's degree in economics from Punjab University, Lahore.

== Career ==
Associated Group was cofounded by Ahmed and his father in 1965. Its companies include Jamshoro Joint Venture Limited, Pakistan GasPort Consortium Limited, Lub Gas, Mehran LPG, AG Publications, and Associated Estate Developers (AEDL). AG has its headquarters at Lahore and offices in Islamabad and Karachi. AG's philanthropic efforts are directed through the Zohra and Z. Z. Ahmed Foundation. AG chairman Ahmed is also the Publisher and chairman of the board of Newsweek Pakistan.

In 2024, the Sindh High Court returned to Pakistan's National Accountability Bureau (NAB) a corruption reference filed against Ahmed and his sons owing to lack of jurisdiction, bringing to a close a case pending since 2019.

== Awards and recognition ==
The state of Oklahoma declared 21 April 2009, as "Iqbal Z. Ahmed Day" to commemorate, according to the proclamation issued by Governor Brad Henry.

== Organizations ==
Ahmed is the chairperson of Lahore Literary Festival Society, president of Government College University's (GCU) Endowment Trust Fund, member of the Faiz Ahmed Faiz Foundation, chairman of the Services Institute of Medical Sciences (SIMS), president of King Edward Medical University's (KEMU) Mobilization Fund, and a trustee of National College of Arts' (NCA) Endowment Board. He has also served on the board of the Punjab Red Crescent Society, and is a member of the American Business Forum (ABF). Ahmed is also the elected chairman of the LPG Association of Pakistan (LPGAP). He has previously served as the president of the India-Pakistan World Punjabi Organization.

== Philanthropy ==
In his individual capacity and through his foundation, the Zohra and Z.Z. Ahmed Foundation, Ahmed has undertaken philanthropy worth over $1.5 million. Spanning an array of fields from education to healthcare to community empowerment, and the arts, the Zohra and Z.Z. Ahmed Foundation was recognized for its charity outlay in 2012 by the Pakistan Center for Philanthropy as one of the top 10 institutions in Pakistan.

Over the years, he has served as patron of the Government College University; National College of Arts; Beaconhouse National University; LABARD; Edhi Foundation; and the Shaukat Khanum Memorial Cancer Hospital. In 2024, he was re-appointed President of the Executive Committee of the Endowment Fund Trust of Government College University for a two-year term, having previously served in the same position from 2005–2022, and raising over Rs. 500 million for the Trust.
