= Mike Agee =

American football player and coach (1938–1990)

Biographical details
- Born: June 7, 1938; Colfax, Washington, U.S.
- Died: February 1, 1990 (aged 51); Riverside County, California, U.S.

Playing career
- 1956–1959: Washington State
- 1965: Annapolis Sailors
- 1966–1967: Virginia Sailors
- Positions: Quarterback, defensive back

Coaching career (HC unless noted)
- 1966–1967: Georgetown

John Michael Agee (June 7, 1938 – February 1, 1990) was an American football player and coach. He served as the head football coach at Georgetown University in Washington, D.C. from 1966 to 1967.
