= Jonis Agee =

American novelist

- Born: May 31, 1943 (age 83); Omaha, Nebraska, U.S.
- Education: University of Iowa (BA); Binghamton University (MA, PhD)
- Occupations: Novelist; short story writer; screenwriter; essayist; teacher
- Spouse: Brent Spencer
- Children: 2

Jonis Agee (born May 31, 1943 in Omaha, Nebraska) is an American professor and writer of short stories, novels, essays, and screenplays. She is the author of thirteen books, including five novels and five collections of short fiction. Three of her books have been New York Times Notable Books.

== Biography ==
Agee was born in Omaha, Nebraska, and grew up in Nebraska and Missouri. She earned her BA from the University of Iowa, and her MA and PHD from Binghamton University.

== Career ==
Agee taught at the College of St. Catherine and the University of Michigan. She is the Adele Hall Professor of English at the University of Nebraska–Lincoln, where she teaches creative writing and twentieth-century fiction.

Jonis Agee has written thirteen books. Her recent book, The River Wife (Random House, 2007), is about five generations of women during nineteenth-century South. The book was selected by the Book of the Month Club, the Literary Guild, and as a main selection by the Quality Paperback Book Club. In the past, Strange Angel, Bend This Heart, and Sweet Eyes were all named a Notable Book by The New York Times Book Review.

== Personal life ==
Agee lives on an acreage north of Omaha, Nebraska, along the Missouri River, with her husband, writer Brent Spencer. She owns 20 pairs of cowboy boots.

== Selected works ==
=== Novels ===
- Sweet Eyes (1991)
- Strange Angels (1993)
- South of Resurrection (1998)
- The Weight of Dreams (2000)
- The River Wife (2007)
- The Bones of Paradise (2016)

=== Short story collections ===
- Pretend We've Never Met (1989)
- Bend This Heart (1989)
- A .38 Special and a Broken Heart (1995)
- Taking the Wall (1999)
- Acts of Love on Indigo Road (2003)

=== Poetry ===
- Houses (1973)
- Mercury (1981)

=== Screenplays ===
- Full Throttle (2007)

=== Anthologies ===
- Stiller's Pond (1996)

== Awards ==
- Minnesota State Arts Board Award in Fiction, 1977
- National Endowment for the Arts grant in fiction, 1978
- Bush Grant for Faculty Development in Creative Writing, 1983
- Loft-McKnight Award in Fiction, 1989
- Notable Book of the Year for Bend This Heart, New York Times, 1989
- Loft-McKnight Award of Distinction, 1991
- Notable Book of the Year for Sweet Eyes, New York Times, 1991
- Notable Book of the Year for Strange Angels, New York Times, 1993
- ForeWord Magazine's Editor's Choice Award for Taking the Wall, 2000
- Nebraska Book Award for The Weight of Dreams, 2000
- Nebraska Book Award Acts of Love on Indigo Road, 2004
- ForeWord Magazine's Gold Medal in Fiction for Acts of Love on Indigo Road, 2004
- John Gardner Fiction Award for The River Wife, Binghamton University, 2008
- Distinguished Artist Award in Fiction, Nebraska Arts Council, 2009
- Backwaters Press Publication Award, Nebraska Arts Council, 2009
- Mark Twain Award for Distinguished Contribution to Midwestern Literature, The Society for the Study of Midwestern Literature, 2009
- George Garrett Award, Association of Writers and Writing Programs, 2010
- Outstanding Research and Creativity Award (ORCA), University of Nebraska, 2010
