= William C. Agee =

American curator (1936–2022)

William C. Agee (September 26, 1936 – December 24, 2022) was an American curator. He was director of exhibitions and collections at the Pasadena Art Museum from 1970 to 1974. He then was the head of the Museum of Fine Arts, Houston, until 1982. From 1988 to 2014, he was a professor of art history at Hunter College.

He had a BA from Princeton University and a MA from Yale University.
