= Asnières (Van Gogh series) =

Location and painting series by Vincent van Gogh

Fishing in Spring, the Pont de Clichy (Asnières)
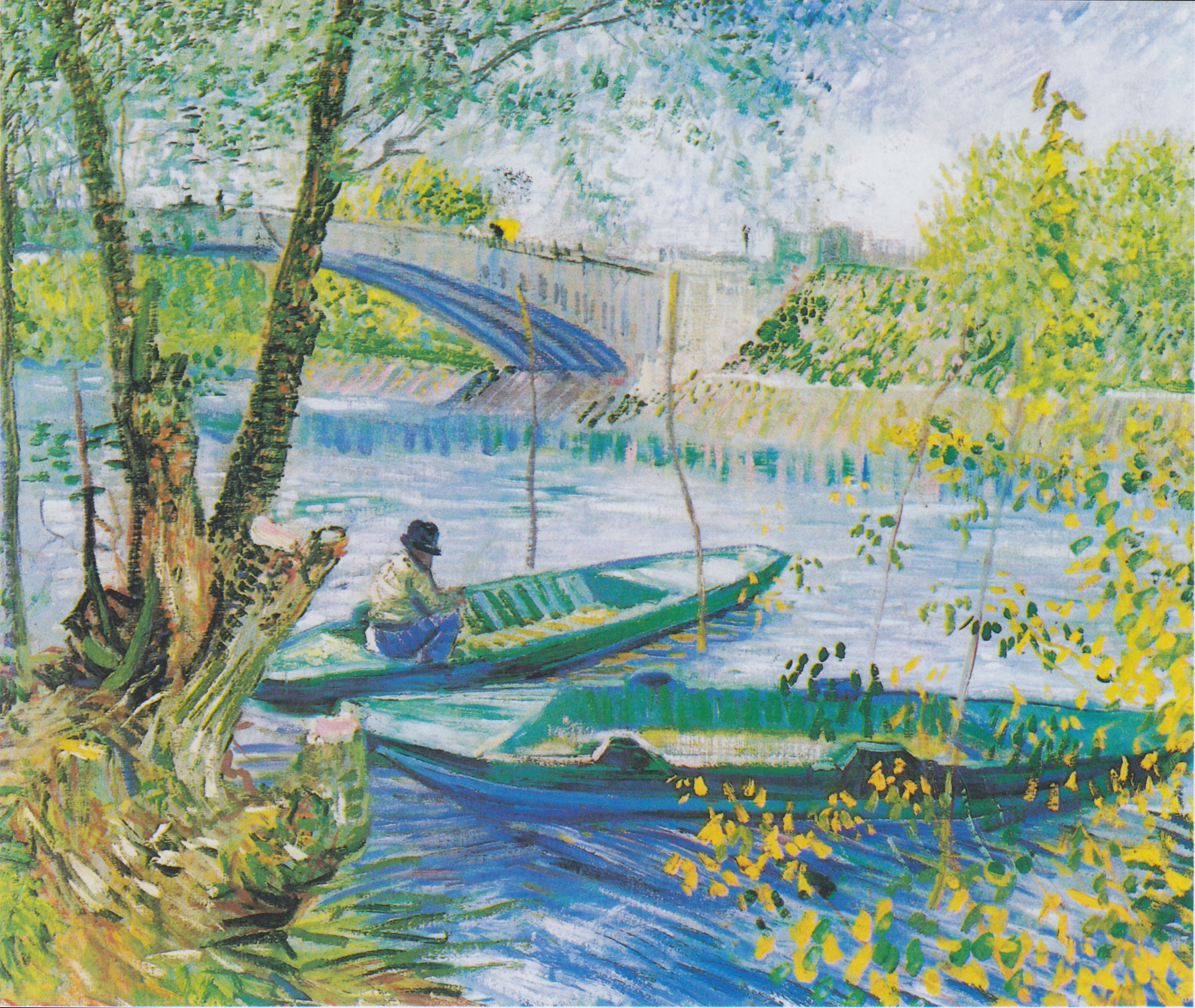
- Artist: Vincent van Gogh
- Year: 1887
- Catalogue: F354; JH1270
- Medium: Oil on canvas
- Dimensions: 50.5 cm × 60 cm (19.9 in × 24 in)
- Location: Art Institute of Chicago, Chicago

Asnières, now named Asnières-sur-Seine, is the subject and location of paintings that Vincent van Gogh made in 1887. The works, which include parks, restaurants, riverside settings and factories, mark a breakthrough in van Gogh's artistic development. In the Netherlands his work was shaped by great Dutch masters as well as Anton Mauve a Dutch realist painter who was a leading member of the Hague School and a significant early influence on his cousin-in-law van Gogh. In Paris van Gogh was exposed to and influenced by Impressionism, Symbolism, Pointillism, and Japanese woodblock print genres.

During van Gogh's first twelve months in Paris he absorbed a lot of information about modern art from the best of the avant-garde artists of the time, but in practice his work in 1886 and early 1887 varied little from his paintings in the Netherlands. In the early 1887 he stayed with Émile Bernard and his parents in Asnières and the budding spring seemed to trigger an awakening within van Gogh where he experimented with the genres to develop his personal style. In a country setting, undergoing industrialization, van Gogh was able to depict his reverence for rural life and express concern about encroachment of industrialization. With new techniques, van Gogh produced paintings evoked tenderness of couples taking a walk in the park or social commentary about the ways in which factories affected country life.

== Background ==
=== Paris ===
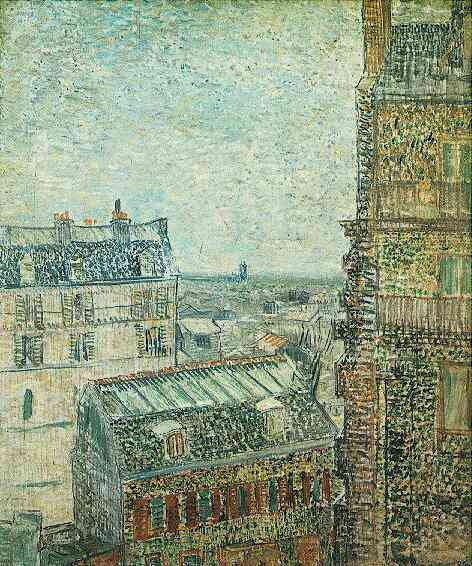
View of Paris from Vincent's Room in the Rue Lepic, 1887
Van Gogh Museum, Amsterdam (F341)

In 1886 van Gogh left the Netherlands for Paris never to return. His brother Theo, a successful Parisian art dealer, provided Vincent the support and connections for an immersion in modern art. In the Netherlands van Gogh was influenced by great Dutch masters, as well as his cousin-in-law Anton Mauve, a Dutch realist painter who was a leading member of the Hague School and a significant early influence. Starting March 1886 van Gogh studied with Fernand Cormon. During that time he lived with his brother Theo, who leased a large apartment on Rue Lepic in Montmartre with space for a studio for Vincent. Three months later van Gogh abandoned his studies with Cormon, but his education continued as he met local artists. During 1886 he was introduced to Impressionist artists and their works, such as Edgar Degas, Claude Monet, Auguste Renoir, Georges Seurat and Paul Signac. In 1887 Van Gogh continued to make important connections with other artists who he befriended and exchanged paintings with, such as Louis Anquetin, Émile Bernard, Armand Guillaumin, Lucien Pissarro and Signac. Having been introduced to Impressionism and Pointillism in Paris, van Gogh began experimenting with related techniques, first on a series of self-portraits before he moved on to larger, more complex compositions.

Many of the Impressionist artists also shared his interest in Japanese wood block prints. The works of ukiyo-e artists, Hiroshige and Hokusai greatly influenced van Gogh, both for the beautiful subject matter and the style of flat patterns of colors, without shadow. Van Gogh arranged an exhibit in Paris of Japanese prints at Café du Tambourin.

In the two years, from 1886 through 1888, van Gogh emerged as a sophisticated, thoughtful and provoking artist. It is through association with artists in Paris that he began to dream of a utopian artists community where "like-minded" individuals would realize "the perfect art."

=== Asnières-sur-Seine ===
Asnières

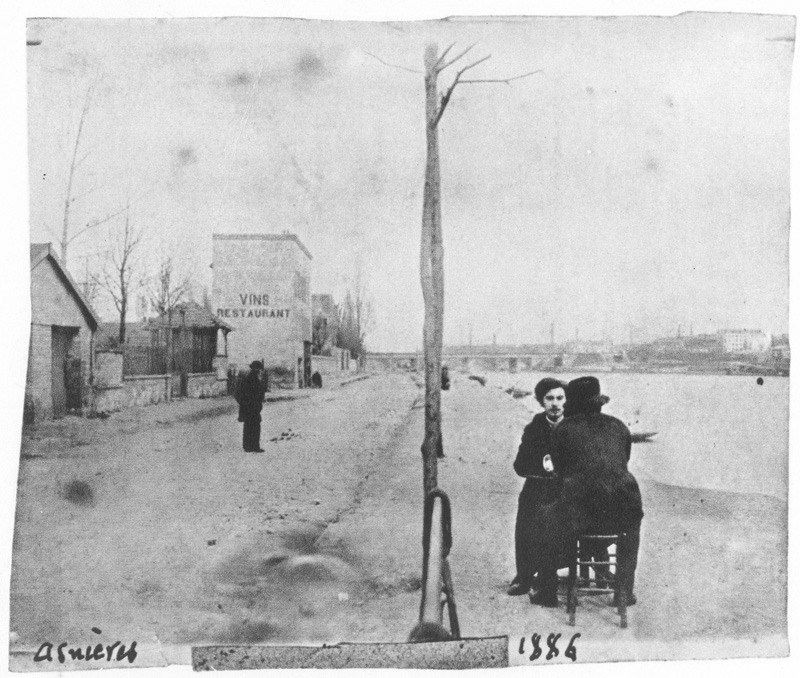
Émile Bernard and Vincent van Gogh (his back to the camera) along the Seine in Asnières

A Sunday Afternoon on the Island of La Grande Jatte – 1884
by Georges-Pierre Seurat
Art Institute of Chicago

Asnières (pronounced /a-nee-air/), now named Asnières-sur-Seine, a town in the northern suburbs of Paris located on the banks of the Seine and near the fortifications of Paris. In the 19th century Parisians took a short train ride to Asnières for boating, including rowing meets; festivals; and the "unrestrained atmosphere" of its dances. The Goncourt brothers [Edmond and Jules de Goncourt] wrote of Asnieres in their 1867 novel Manette Salomon. Anatole, a painter, meets up with his friends near a riverside cabaret, and they all got into his boat "comrades of both sexes, approximations of painters, species of artists, vague women known only by nicknames, actresses from Grenelle, unemployed lorettes [women supported by their lovers], all tempted by the idea of the day in the country and a drink of claret in a cabaret."

Impressionists were interested in painting this area, en plein air (English: in the open), for the interesting scenery: bridges over the Seine, boats along the banks of the river, outdoor cafés and treed settings.

Longing for tranquil settings, van Gogh began to paint in Asnières in April 1887 where fellow artists Signac and Bernard lived. Beyond the city fortifications and along the banks of the Seine, lay Asnières and the island of Grand Jatte. He experimented with a lighter, more colorful palette than used in his early Dutch and Montmartre paintings. When painting with Bernard, they often painted in the open air. To his sister Wil, Vincent wrote, "While painting at Asnières, I saw more colors than I have ever seen before." Instead of working in the somber colors of his early work, he embraced the use of color and light of the Impressionists. Also influenced by Pointillism, van Gogh modified his traditional style and used vivid color, shorter brushstrokes and perspective to engage the viewer. His views of the banks of the Seine are an important progression for his later landscape paintings. In Asnières, within walking distance of Theo's flat in Montmartre, Vincent painted parks, cafés, restaurants and the river.

Signac commented on meeting up with van Gogh, "I would encounter him at Asnières and at Saint-Ouen. We painted together on the riverbanks, we lunched at roadside cafes and we returned by foot to Paris via the Avenues of Saint-Ouen and Clichy. Van Gogh, wearing the blue overalls of a zinc worker, would have little dots of color painted on his shirtsleeves. Striking quite close to me, he would be yelling, gesticulating and brandishing a large size-thirty, freshly painted canvas; in this fashion he would manage to polychrome both himself and the passers-by."

== Paintings ==
=== Parks ===
Parks at Asnières

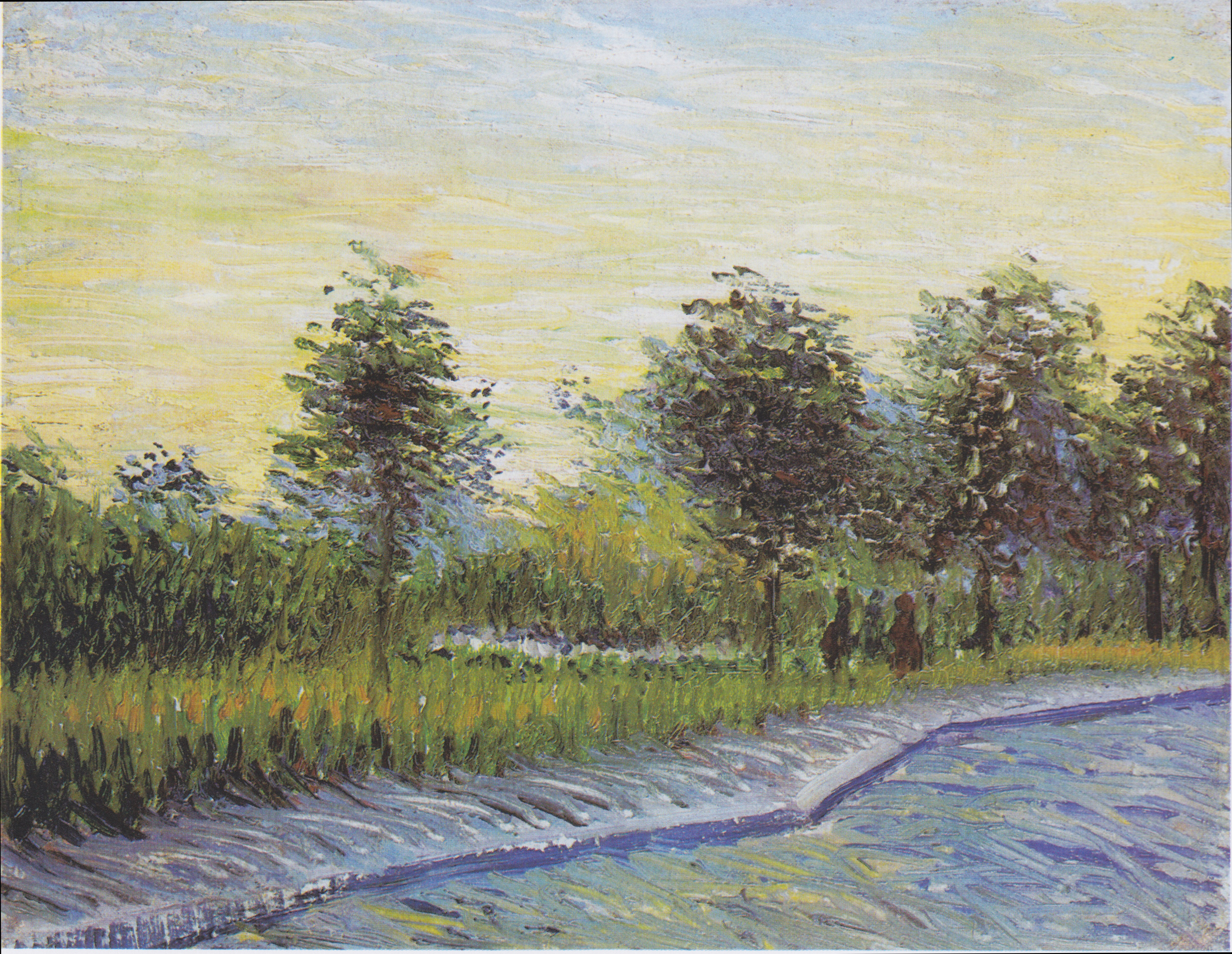
Square Saint-Pierre at Sunset
June–July 1887
Van Gogh Museum, Amsterdam (F275)

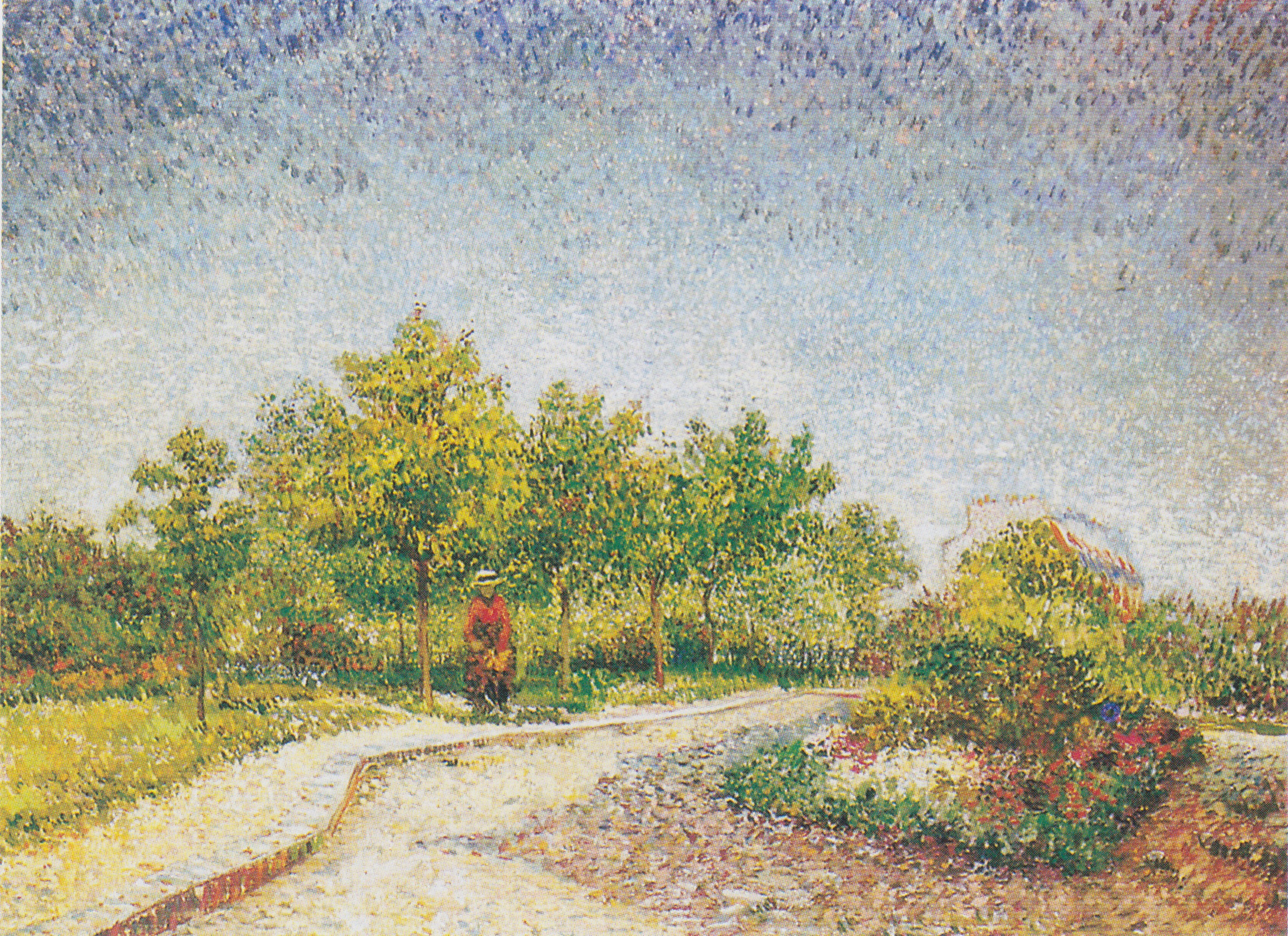
Lane in Voyer d'Argenson Park at Asnières
Spring, 1887
Yale University Art Gallery, New Haven, Conn. (F276)

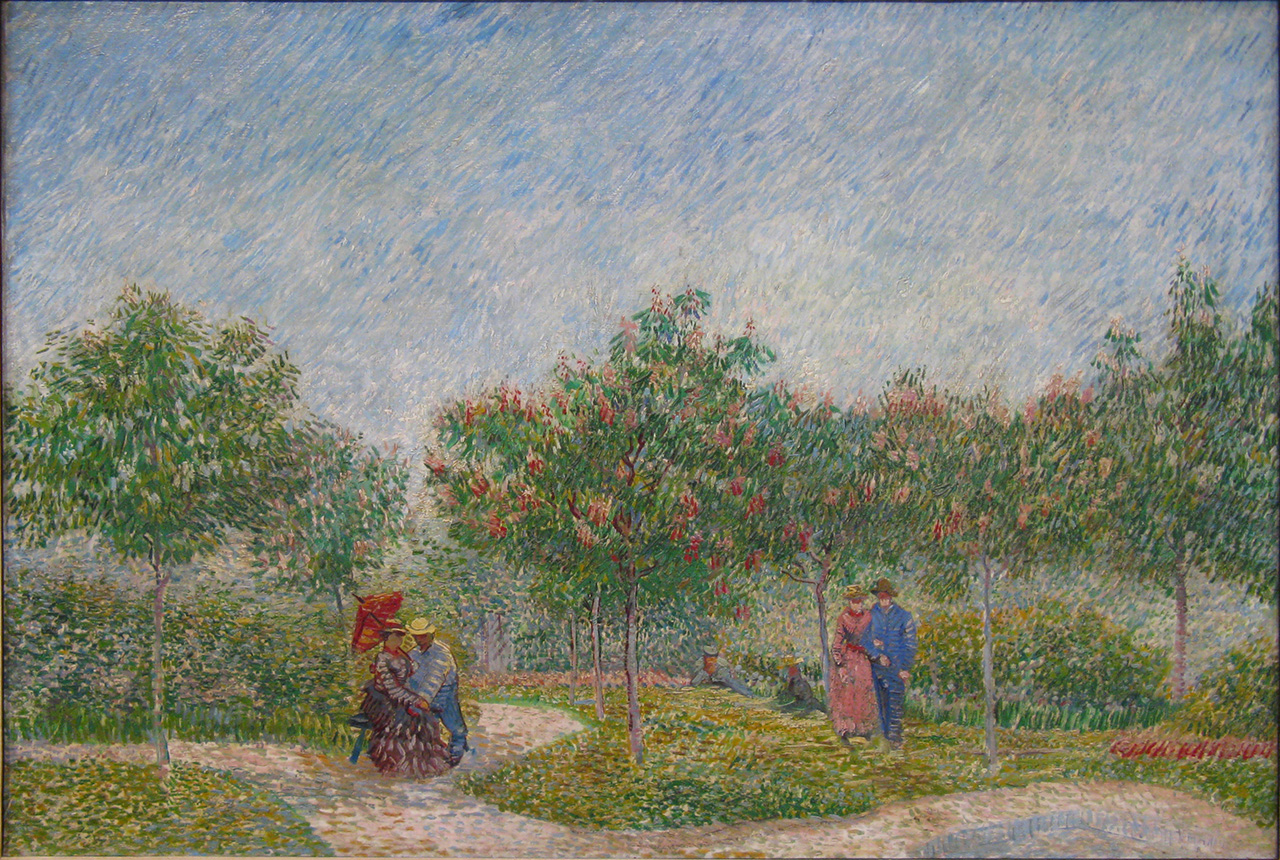
Couples in the Voyer d'Argenson Park at Asnières
June–July 1887
Van Gogh Museum, Amsterdam (F314)

Van Gogh's work in his first year in Paris retained much of the somber attitude and colors of his paintings from the Netherlands. During the spring of 1887 he stayed with Émile Bernard at Bernard's parents home in Asnières. During that time van Gogh began to incorporate the influences he had been exposed to over the past year. His work lightened in "sun-drenched studies". Landscapes began to dominate his subject matter, painted in "the glory of summer and the rich colors of the vegetation". He now caught the sunlight between the leaves.

==== Lane in Voyer d'Argenson Park at Asnières ====
Lane in Voyer d'Argenson Park at Asnières is believed to decorate the wall in another Van Gogh painting, Interior of a Restaurant (F342).

==== Couples in the Voyer d'Argenson Park at Asnières ====
Van Gogh's painting Couples in the Voyer d'Argenson Park at Asnières (F314) was referred to by the artist as "the painting of the garden with sweethearts." The title at the Van Gogh Museum is Garden with courting couples: Square Saint-Pierre, 1887.

The summer park scene, one of his largest canvases, was one of the first paintings that van Gogh exhibited in Paris. Here he integrated what he had learned of Impressionism and Pointillism into his own version of Pointillism. He used a combination of carefully placed small dots and more expressive dashes, like those in the sky, of varying color placed side by side into what is considered his most pointillistic painting. Van Gogh used Divisionism techniques to paint woven fabrics, such as the couple in an Asnières park who share an interlocking pattern in their woven clothes. He collected yarn in different colors and tones to test color contrasts, just as Michel Eugène Chevreul had when he developed his theory on complementary color. The Van Gogh Museum claims that the painting was made in or near Montmartre which about 7 kilometers from Asnières.

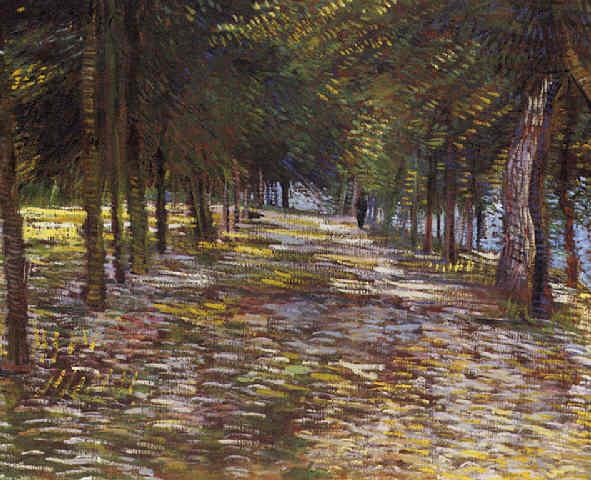
Avenue in Voyer d'Argenson Park at Asnières (b/w copy),
Summer, 1887
Private collection (F277)

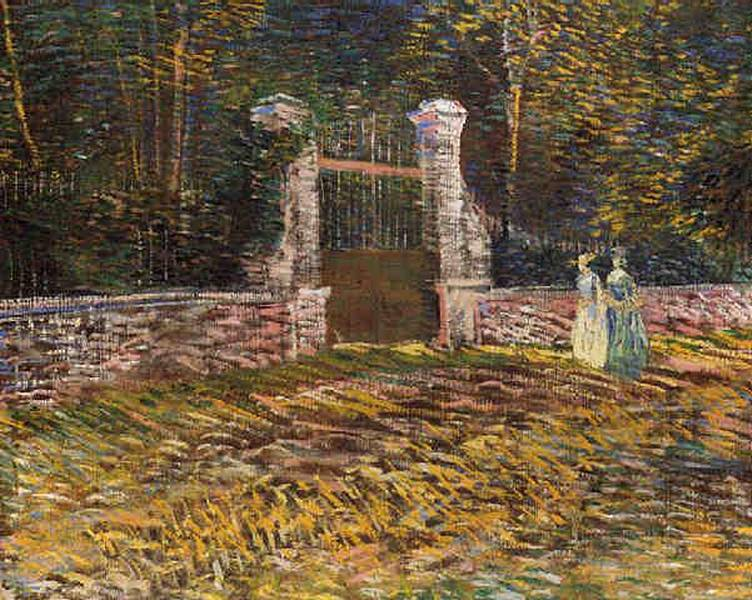
Entrance of Voyer d'Argenson Park at Asnières
1887
Israel Museum, Jerusalem

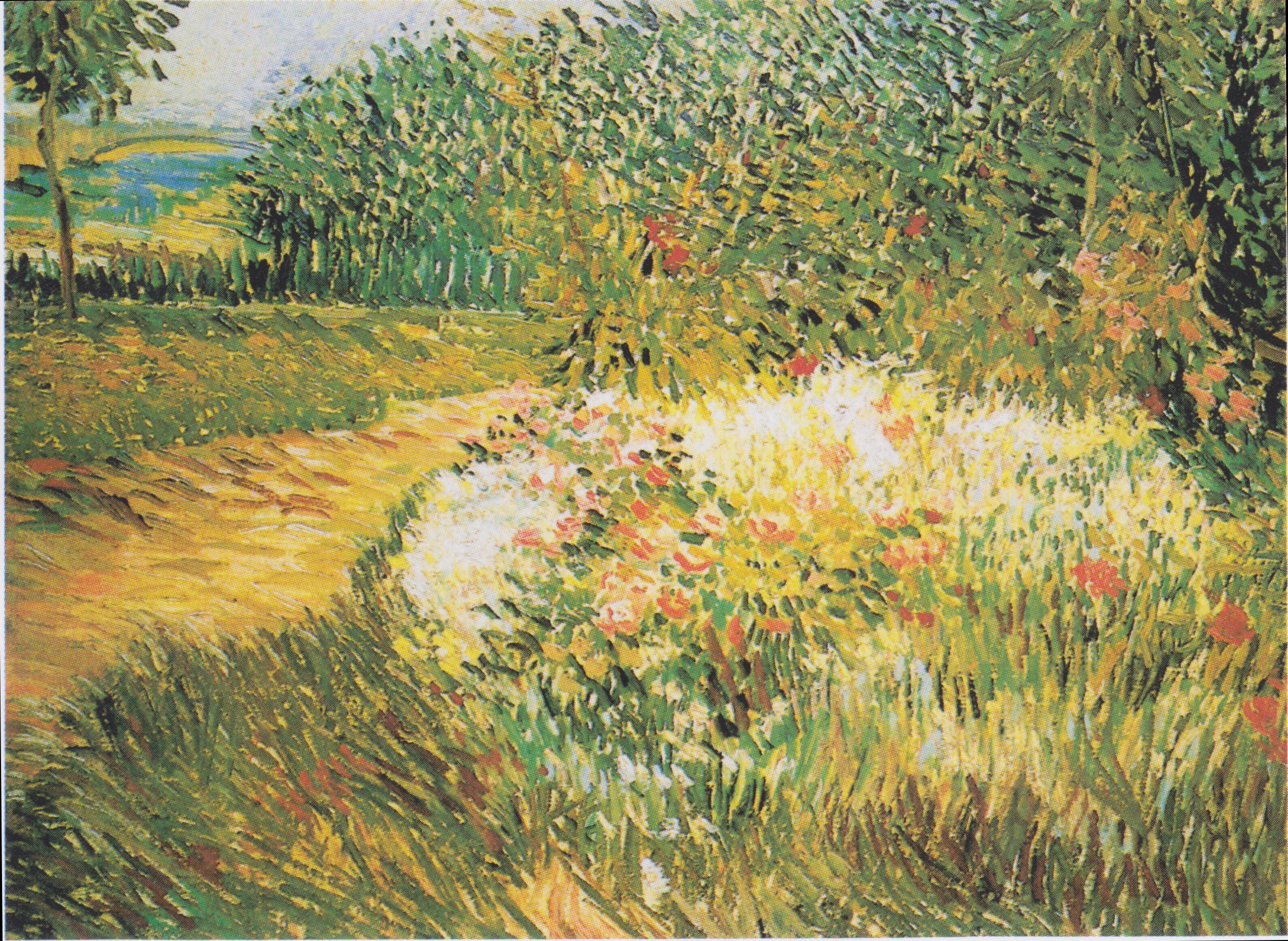
Corner of Voyer d'Argenson Park at Asnières
Summer, 1887
Private collection (F315)

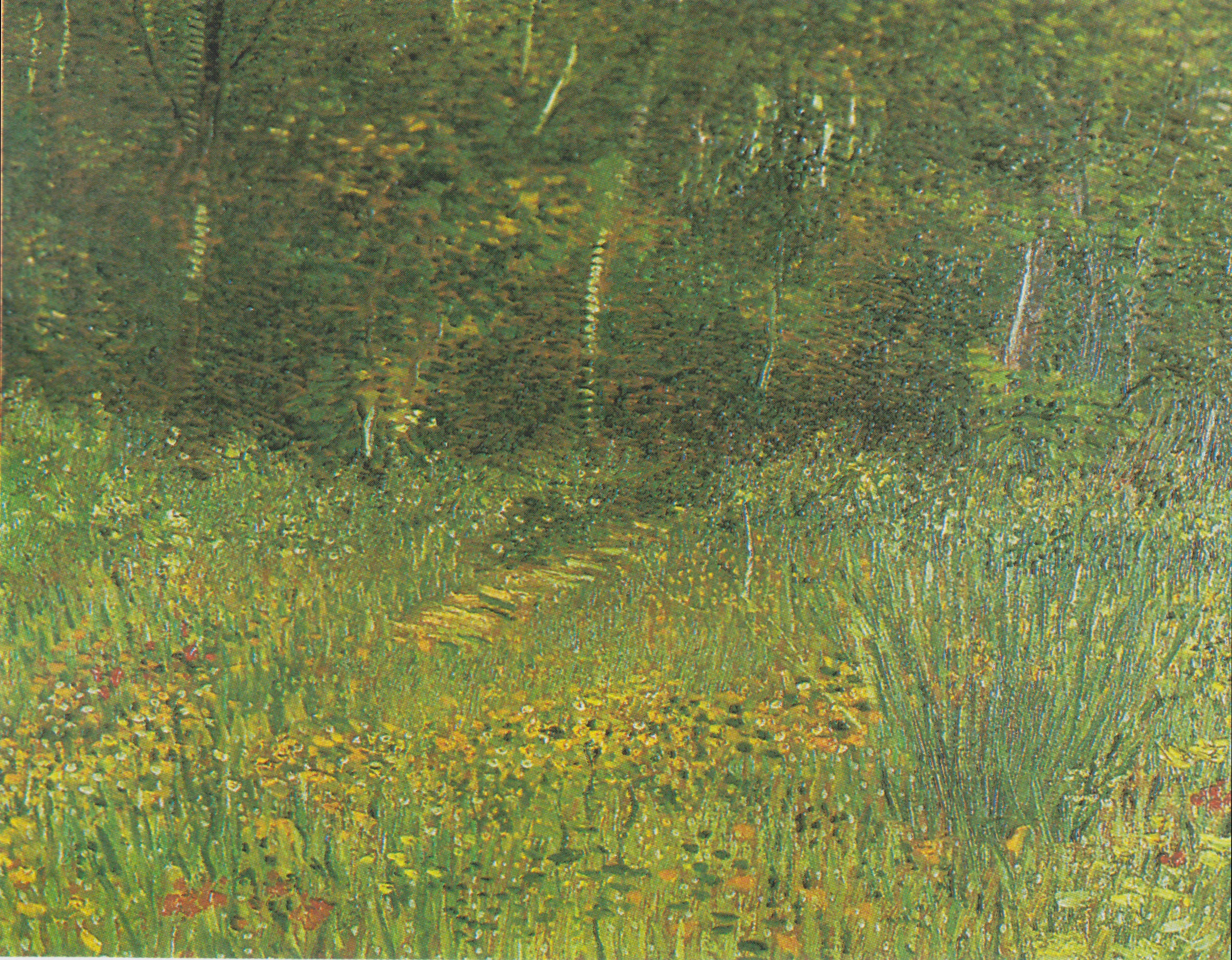
Park at Asnières in Spring
Spring, 1887
Collection Tan Sri Lim Kok Thay, Malaysia (on loan to cruise ship "Norwegian Pearl") (F362)

=== The Seine ===
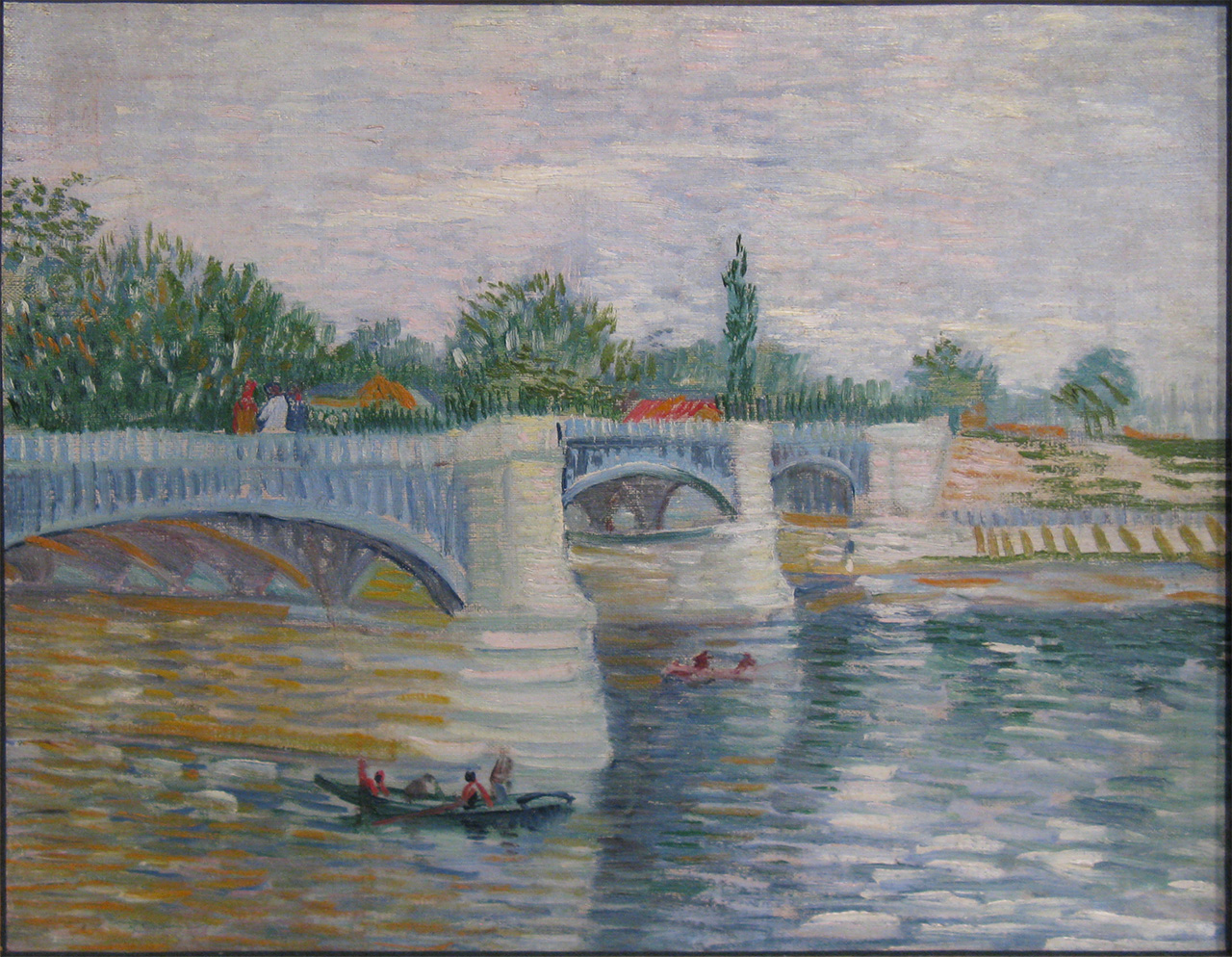
The Seine with the Pont de la Grande Jatte
Summer, 1887
Van Gogh Museum, Amsterdam (F304)

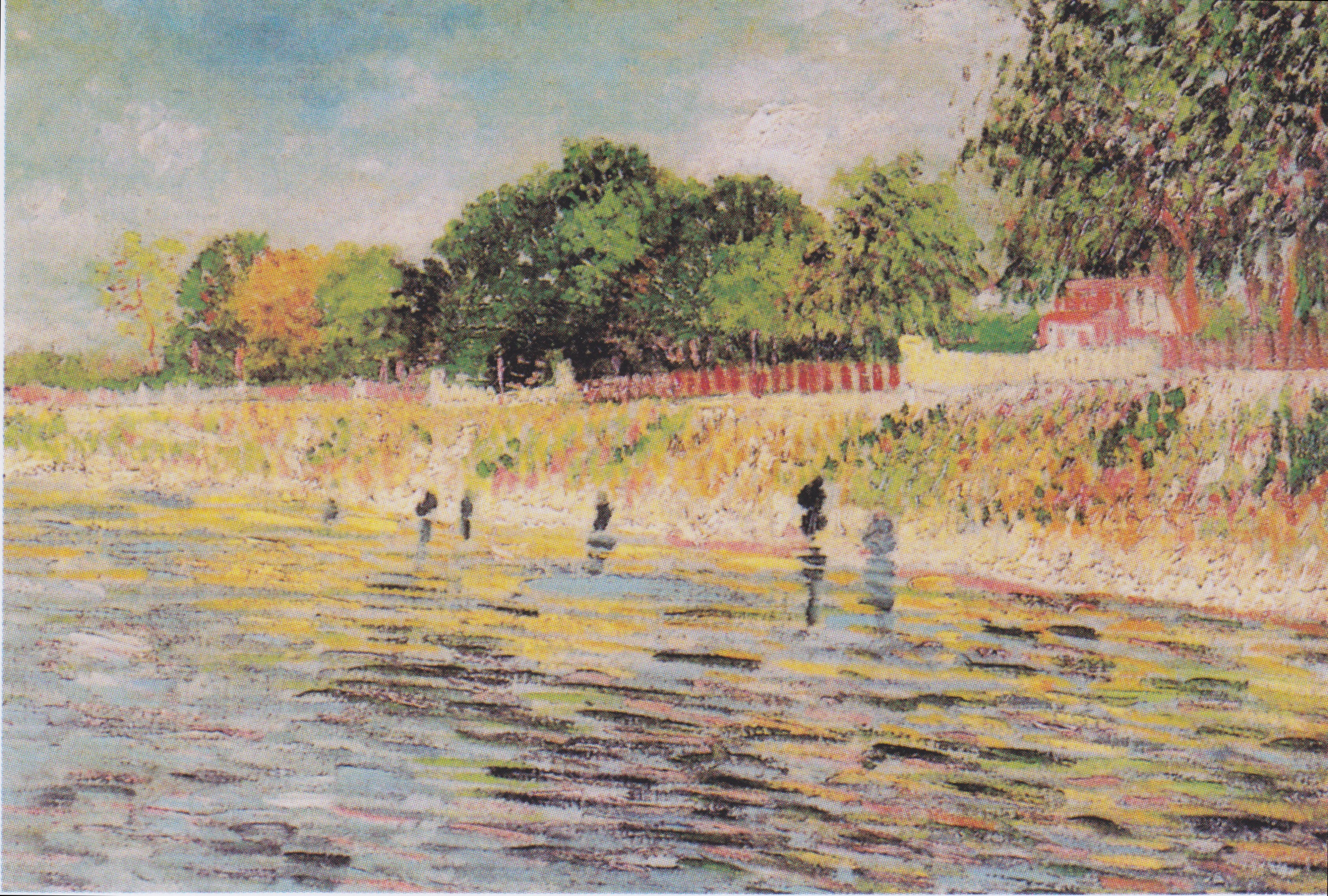
The Banks of the Seine
May–June 1887
Van Gogh Museum, Amsterdam (F293)

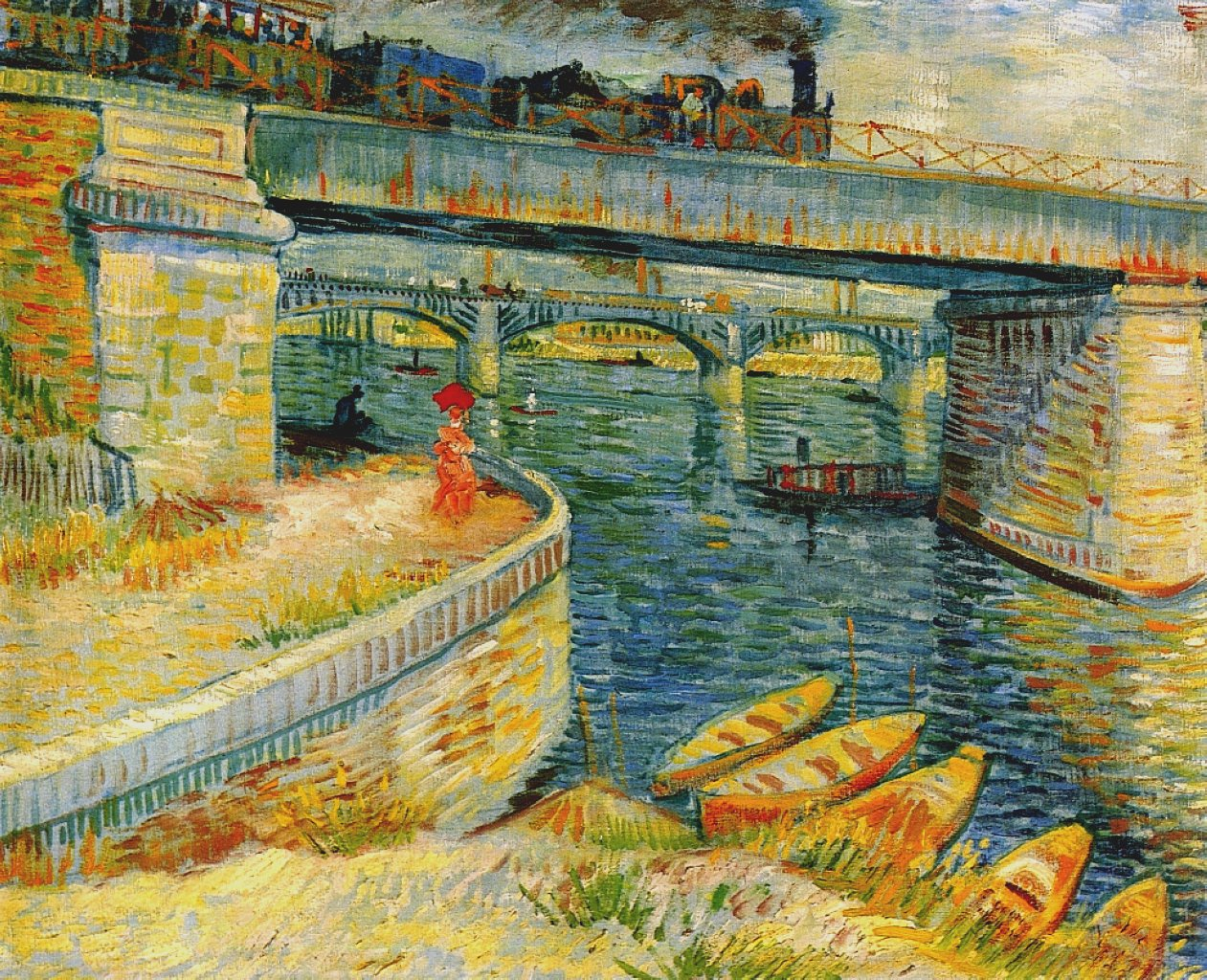
Bridges across the Seine at Asnières
Summer, 1887
Foundation E.G. Bührle, Zurich (F301)

==== The Seine with the Pont de la Grande Jatte ====
The Seine with the Pont de la Grande Jatte (F304) is a painting made by van Gogh of a favored area on the Seine near Asnières. It was made during a period where he explored the use of "dots" of paint set alongside contrasting colors, influenced by Georges Seurat, who introduced Pointillism. In 1885 Seurat made A Sunday Afternoon on the Island of La Grande Jatte and used a technique of placing colored dots on a work which led a movement called "Neo-Impressionism", or "Divisionism" and "Pointillism". Van Gogh was one of the artists later called "Post-Impressionists" who was influenced by Seurat's style that rejected realism and idealism to create a new genre based upon abstraction and simplicity. Van Gogh learned from Seurat the beauty in simplicity and a means to convey messages in a more optimistic, light way than was his work in the Netherlands. While he could not match Seurat's precision, aspects of Pointillism were integrated into van Gogh's work.

==== Bank of the Seine ====
In Bank of the Seine (F293) van Gogh uses Pointillism in the small dots for the trees, larger dots in the sky and dashes for water. Impressionism is harnessed to create light and reflection of the water.

==== Bridges across the Seine at Asnières ====
Bridges across the Seine at Asnières (F301) was painted in open air and bright sunlight. The scene depicts railway bridges over the river. Van Gogh uses light and reflection effectively in this painting. The stone piers of the bridge are reflected in the water and white paint is used for highlights. A woman dressed in pink with a red parasol are the focal point of the composition. The painting is part of a group of suburban landscapes along with a painting in Oxford, both of which Van Gogh had placed in red frames. Van Gogh found this setting through his friend Émile Bernard whom he met when studying with Cormon. Over the two years that Van Gogh was in Paris [1886—1887] he made several paintings of bridges crossing the Seine.

==== Bridge of Asnières ====
Van Gogh wrote of making Bridges of Asnières (F303), "I've been worried by the sunset with figures and a bridge that I spoke of to Bernard. The bad weather prevented me working on the spot and I’ve completely ruined it trying to finish it at home. However I began again at once, the same subject on another canvas, but as the weather was quite different, in grey tones and without figures."

==== Walk Along the Banks of the Seine Near Asnières ====
Walk Along the Banks of the Seine Near Asnières also called Riverbank at Asnières (F299) illustrates van Gogh's technique of using "short, rapid strokes of color to capture the atmosphere of a particular place", something he used with other paintings along the Seine.

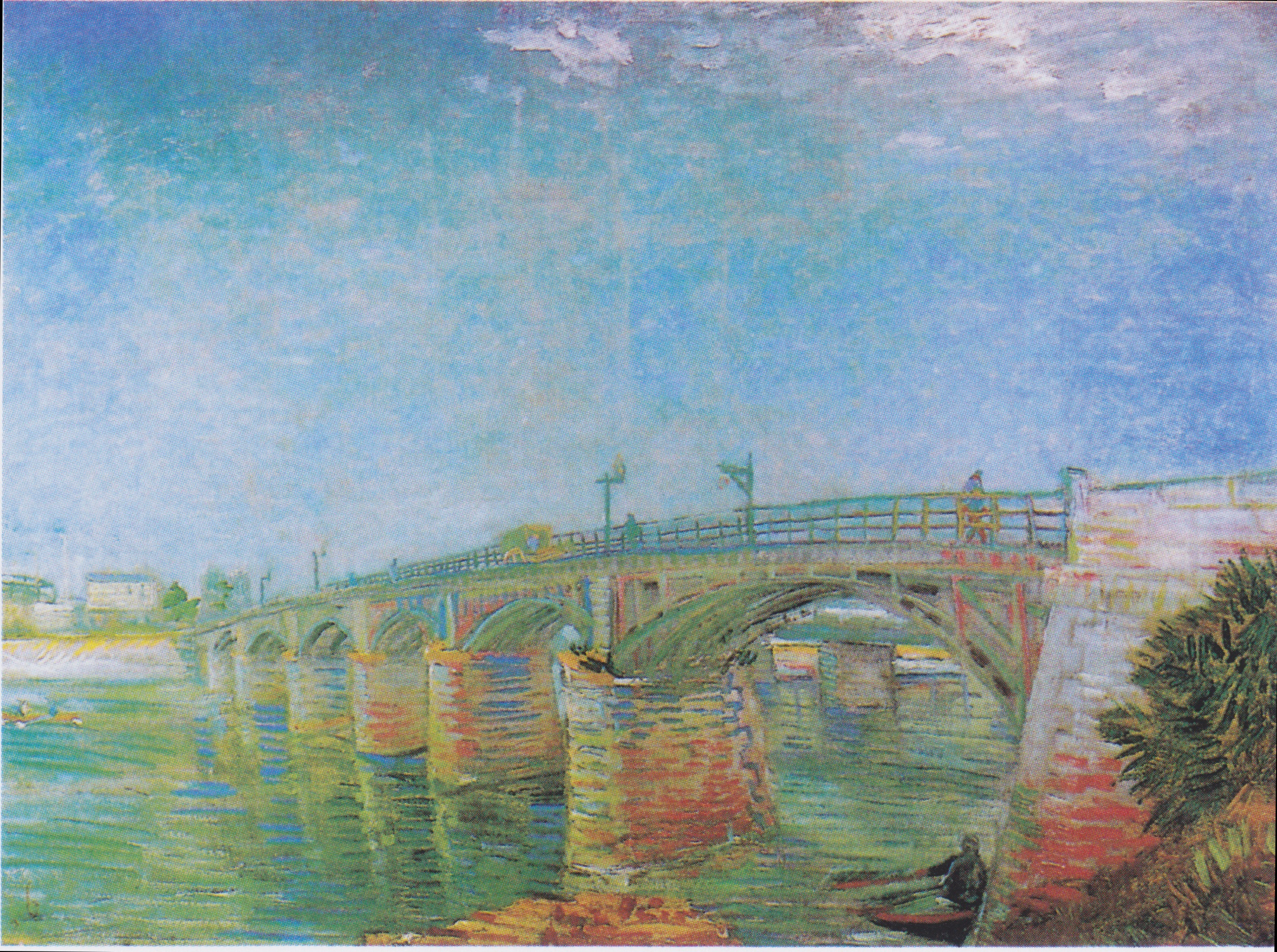
The Seine Bridge at Asnières
Summer, 1887
Museum of Fine Arts, Houston (F240)

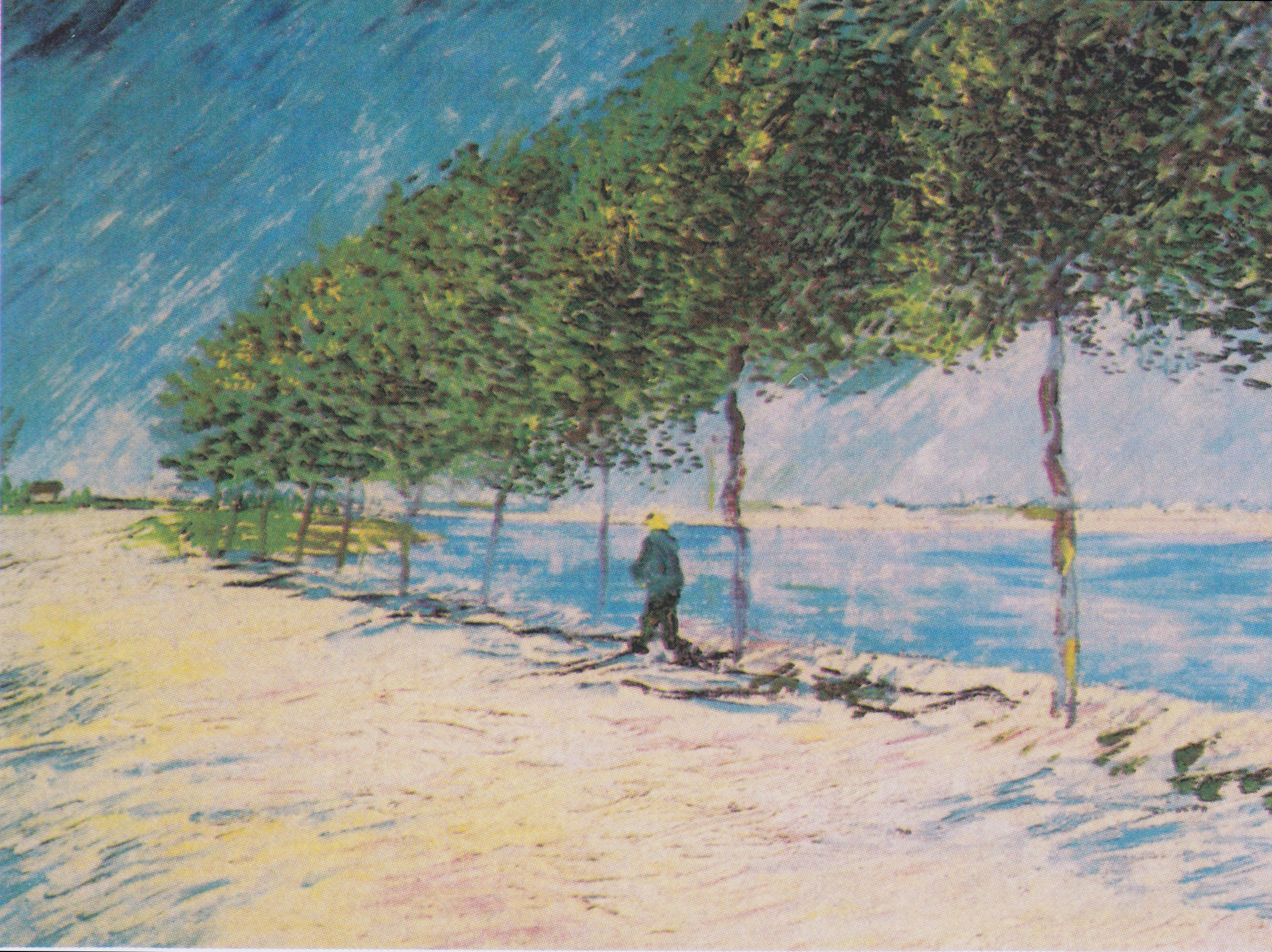
Walk Along the Banks of the Seine Near Asnières
June–July, 1887
Van Gogh Museum, Amsterdam (F299)

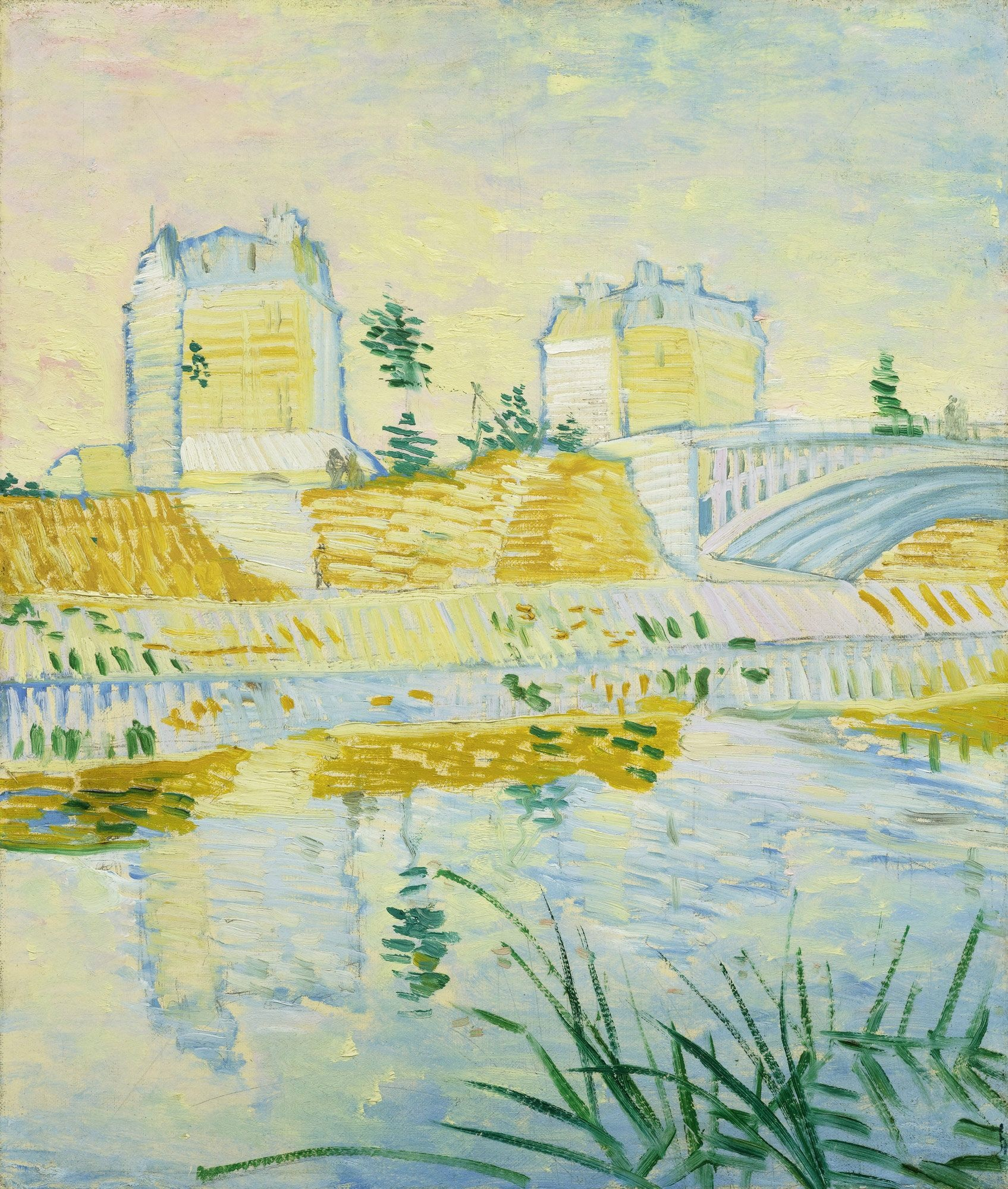
Bridge of Asnières also The Seine with the Pont de Clichy
1887
Private Collection (F303)

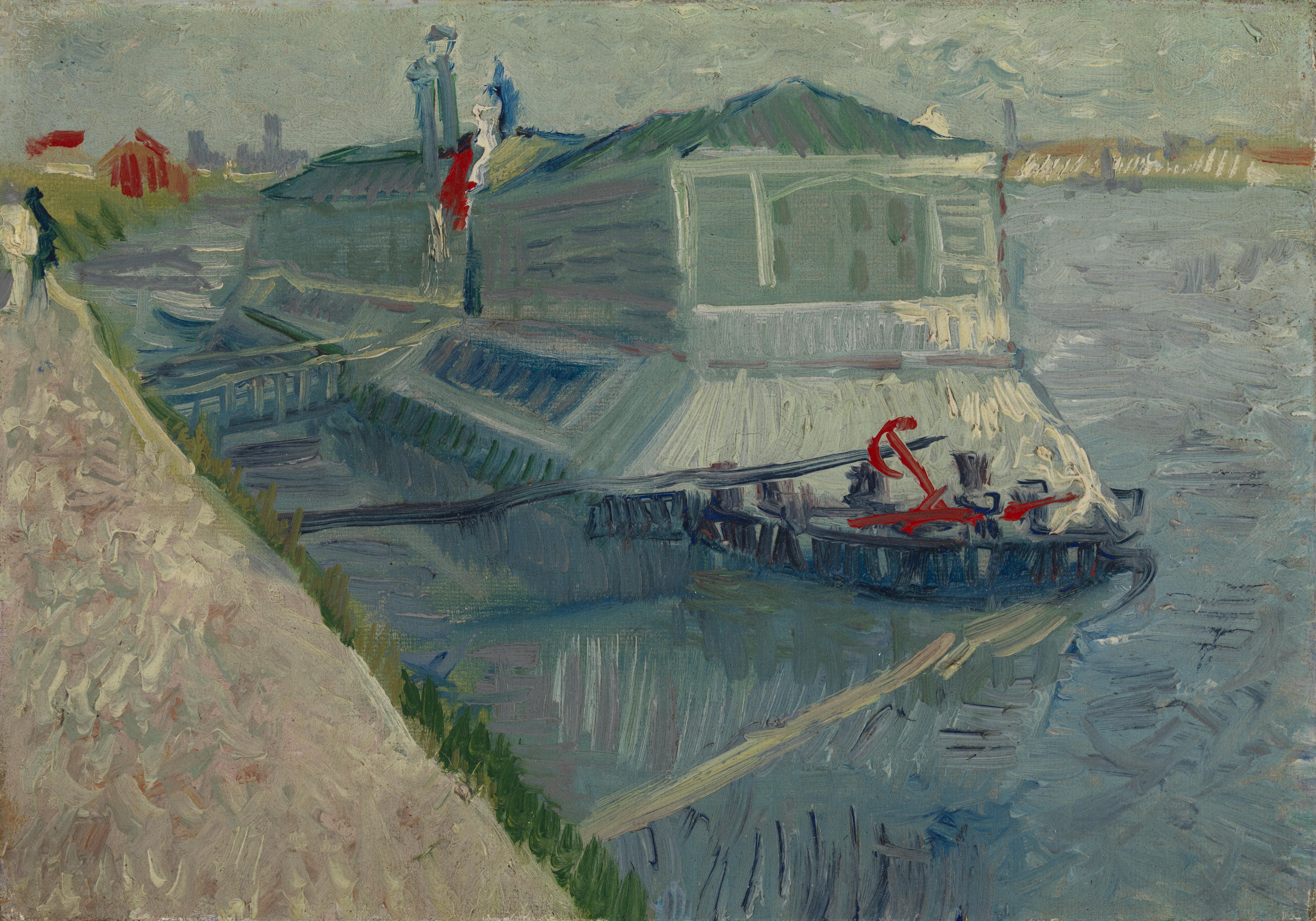
The Laundry Boat on the Seine at Asnières
Summer, 1887
Virginia Museum of Fine Arts, Richmond, Virginia (F311)

=== Restaurants ===
Restaurants at Asnières

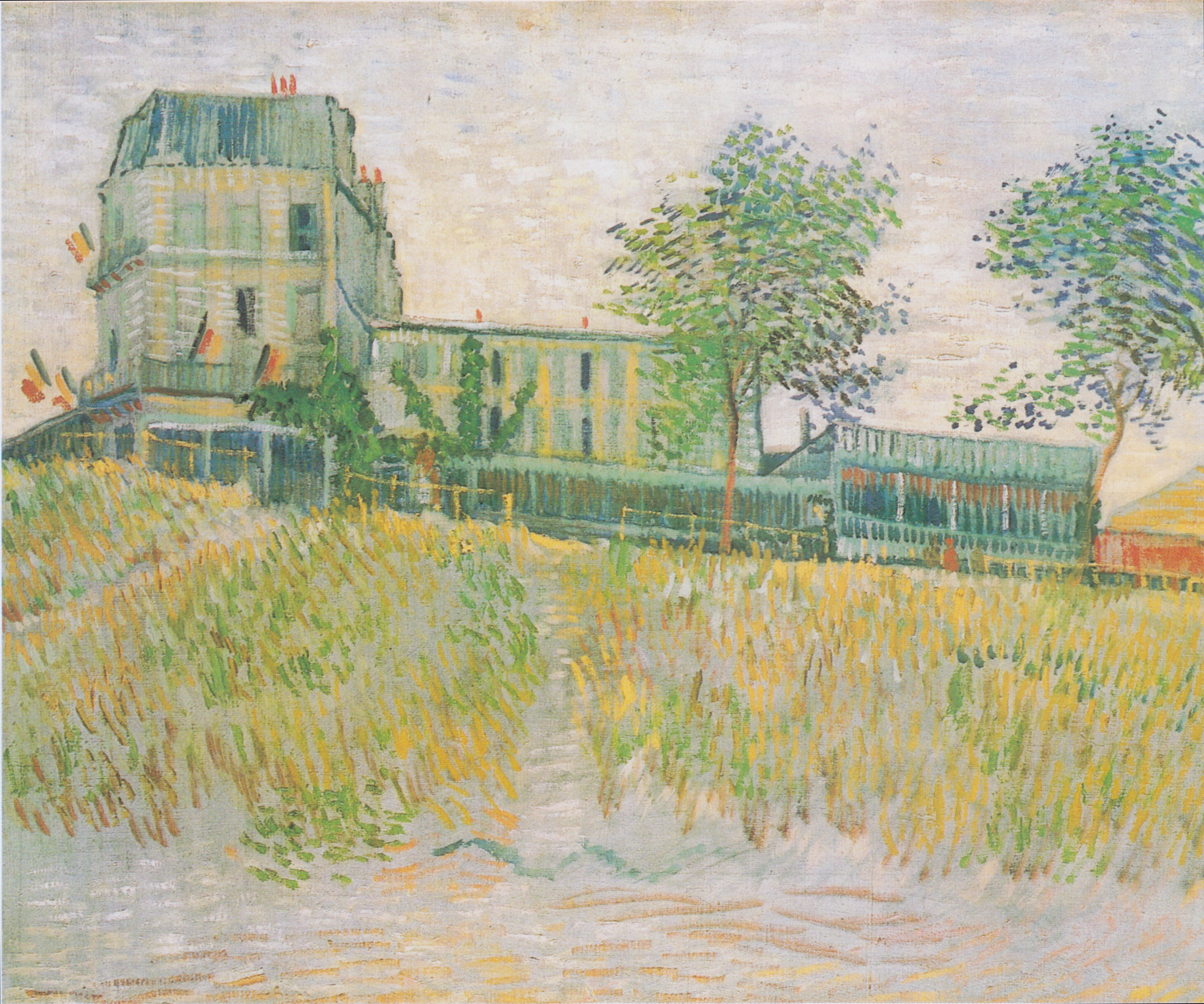
The Restaurant de la Sirène at Asnières
Spring, 1887
Ashmolean Museum, Oxford (F312)

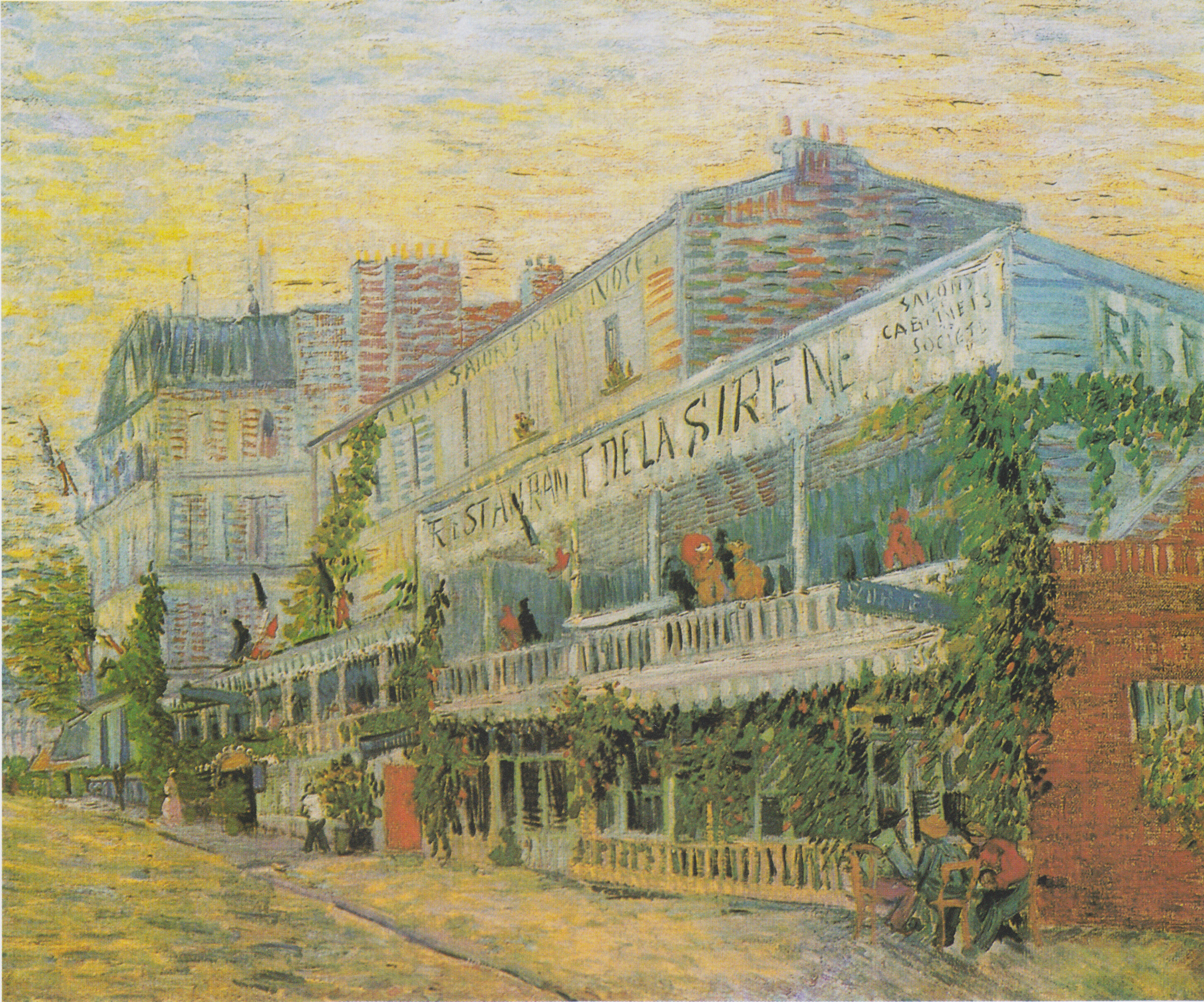
The Restaurant de la Sirène at Asnières
Summer, 1887
Musée d'Orsay, Paris (F313)

==== The Restaurant de la Sirène at Asnières (F312) ====
Impressionistic influences are evident in The Restaurant de la Sirène at Asnières (F312) in the dashes of paint in bright color.

==== The Restaurant de la Sirène at Asnières (F313) ====
In creating The Restaurant de la Sirène at Asnières (F313) van Gogh is clearly influenced by the Impressionist movement, while making it very much his own style. Impressionists like Renoir preferred to show the moods and scenes of the interior of restaurants, while van Gogh often depicts exteriors, such as this painting. He uses vivid colors, yet also brought brightness to the painting with white paint, to depict a summer day. In the foreground three men sit at a table, one of whom is wearing a blue shirt and yellow straw hat, that Paul Signac finds is suggestive of the artist himself. Émile Bernard is believed to be referring to The Restaurant de la Sirène at Asnières when he recounted to Vollard that some of the van Gogh's Paris works featured "smart restaurants decorated with colored awnings and oleanders".

==== Exterior of a Restaurant at Asnières ====
The building's purpose in Exterior of a Restaurant at Asnières (F321) is suggested by the open door, potted plants and outdoor table. The painting portrays a mid-summer day, there is no shade and the colors of the painting are warm summer colors. The planter brims with flowering oleander blossoms. Both the composition and color scheme are simple, the key colors are yellow in the wall and paving and green in the shutters and plants. The motif was first inspired by a Parisian restaurant with a row of six planters filled with shrubs against a yellow wall with green shutters. The colors and shutters were used again in Vincent's House in Arles (The Yellow House) that he made in Arles in 1888.

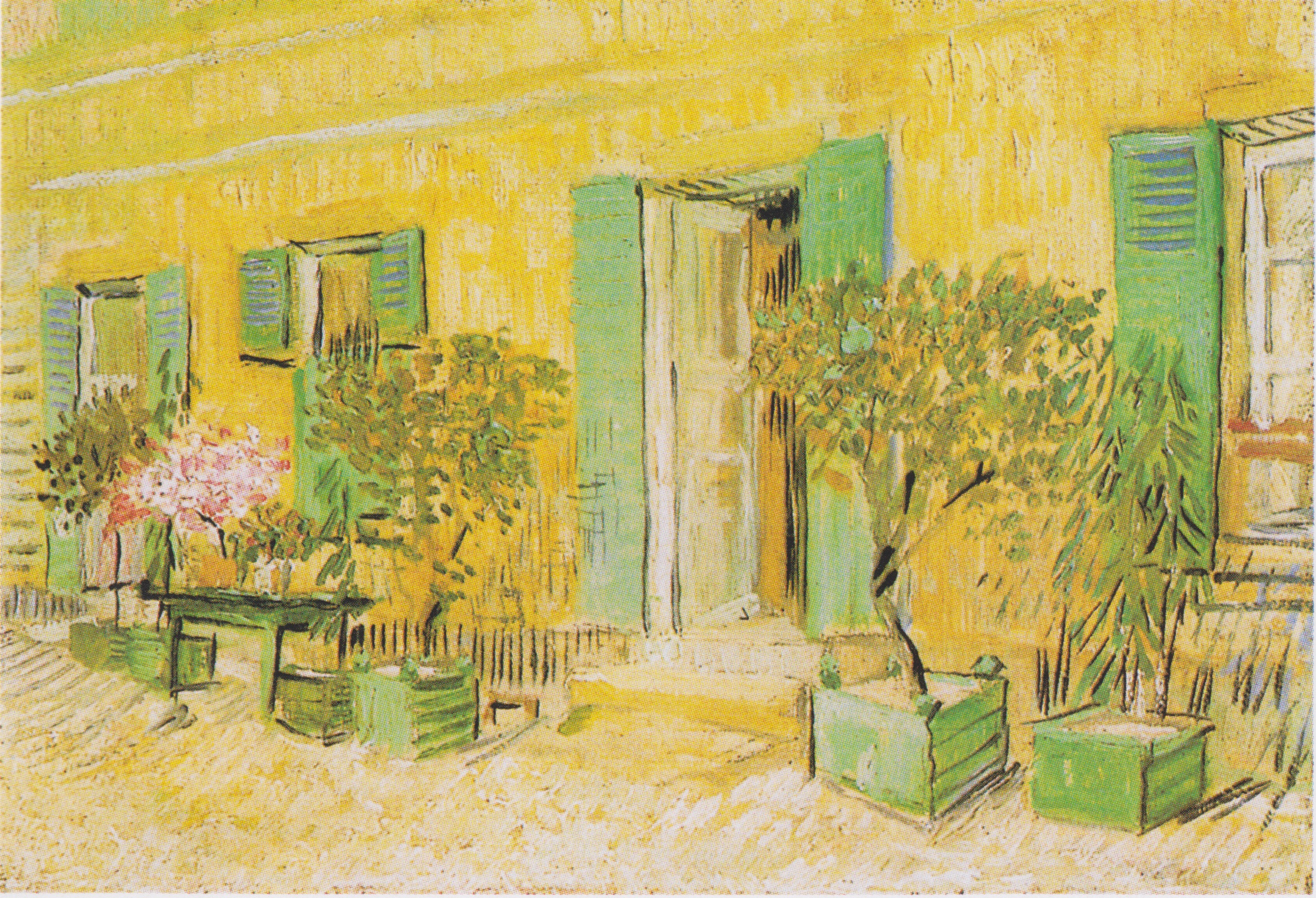
Exterior of a Restaurant at Asnières
Summer, 1887
Van Gogh Museum, Amsterdam (F321)

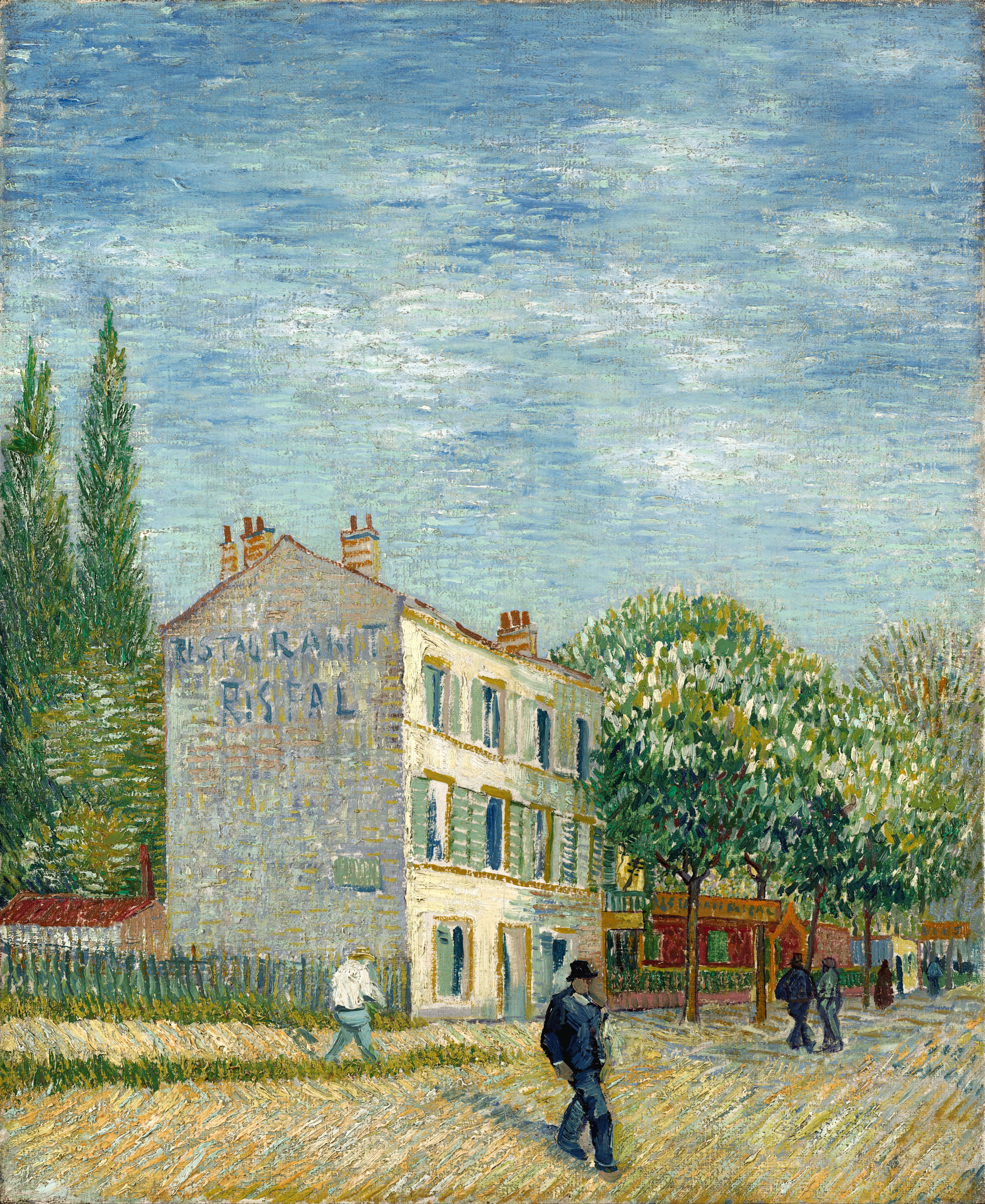
The Rispal Restaurant at Asnières
Summer, 1887
Nelson-Atkins Museum of Art, Kansas City (F355)

=== Factories ===
As industrialization spread across the Parisian countryside, writers spoke out and artists painted a phenomenon called by some "banlieue" or "terrain vague". Victor Hugo wrote a passage added to the 1861 edition of Les Misérables:

"To wander in a kind of reverie, to take a stroll as they call it, is a good way for a philosopher to spend his time: particularly in that kind of bastard countryside, somewhat ugly but bizarre, made up of two different natures, which surrounds certain great cities, notably Paris. To observe the banlieue is to observe an amphibian. End of trees, beginning of roofs, end of grass, beginning of paving stones, end of ploughed fields, beginning of shops, the end of the beaten track, the beginning of passions, the end of the murmur or things divine, the beginning of the noise of humankinds – all this holds an extraordinary interest. And, thus, in these unattractive places, forever marked by the passer-by with the epithet sad, the promenades, apparently aimless, of the dreamer.

Factories at Asnières

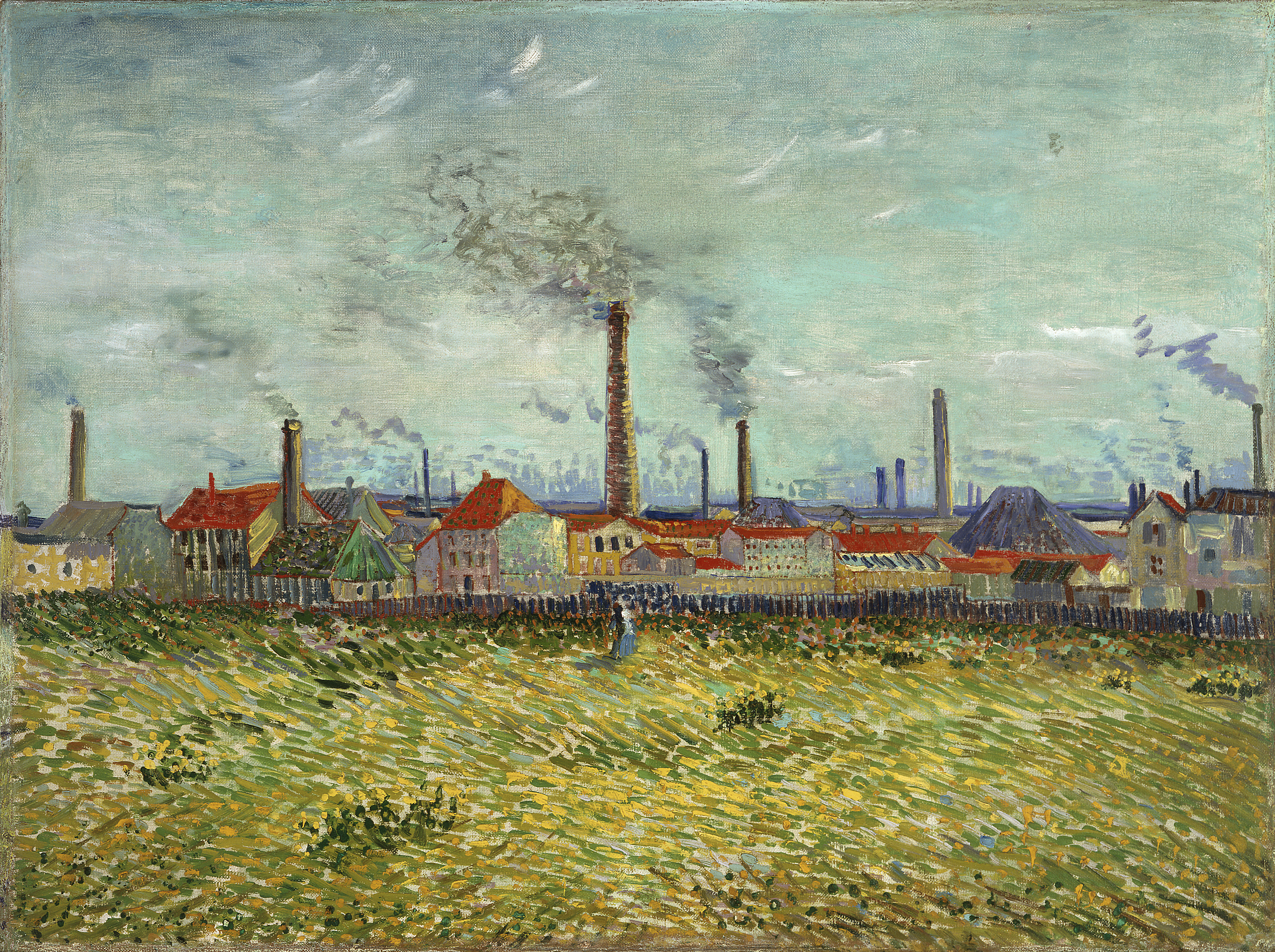
Factories at Asnières Seen from the Quai de Clichy
Summer, 1887
The Saint Louis Art Museum, St. Louis (F317)

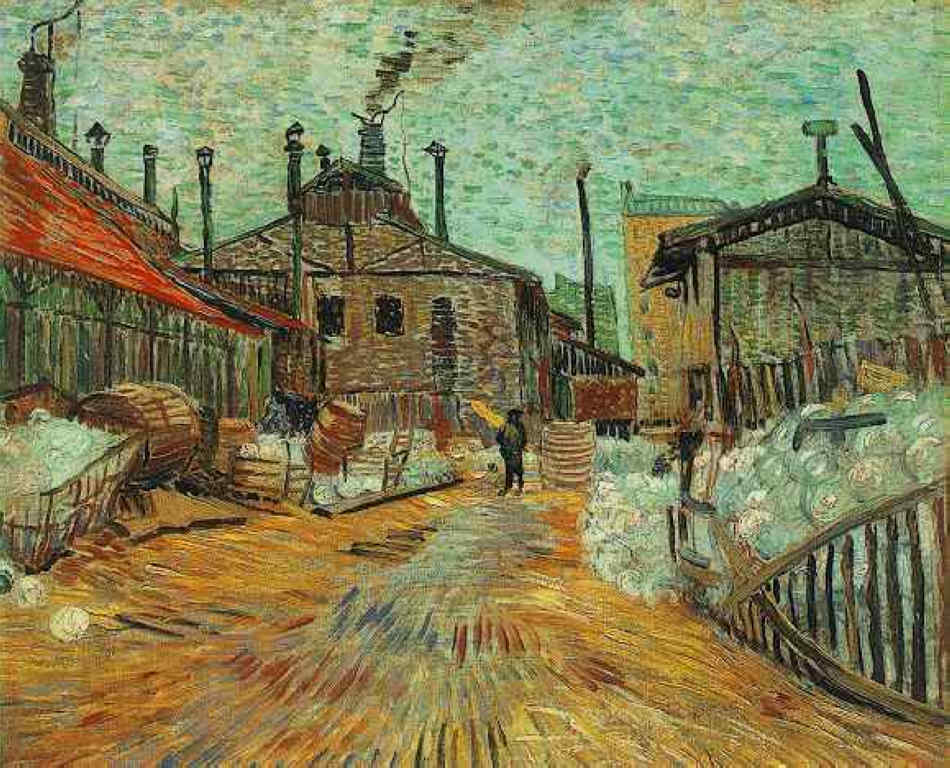
The Factory at Asnières
Summer, 1887
The Barnes Foundation, Merion Station, PA (F318)

To van Gogh, industrialization meant loss of a revered lifestyle, the simple life of the peasant. Paul van der Grijp, author of Art and Exoticism: An Anthropology of the Yearning for Authenticity, wrote of van Gogh's intention to portray his message of concern, "In his representations of the city he mainly paid attention to the expanding outskirts which swallowed up the countryside, whereby city and country life were often juxtaposed, sometimes in the form of trains for factories blotting the countryside." Van Gogh's painting Outskirts of Paris (F264) illustrates the looming encroachment of factories to the countryside.

==== Factories at Asnières Seen from the Quai de Clichy ====
Factories at Asnières is a modern landscape depicting industrial growth as it takes over rural plains, a phenomenon called by some "banlieue" or "terrain vague". A fence demarcates the line between the flowing rural field and emission-generating industrial complex. Van Gogh has used horizontal bands to deliberately depict the earthy hues and movement of the field in contrast to the solid, carefully drawn geometric shapes of the factories and chimneys.

The painting seems to illustrate a line from one of van Gogh's favorite novels, L'Assommoir by Émile Zola: "a great forest of factory chimneys" filled the sky. The topic had been picked up by Impressionists, such as Camille Pissarro, Claude Monet and Armand Guillaumin, but van Gogh may have been most intrigued by a work he saw at the 1886 Société des Artistes Indépendants by Charles Angrand entitled Terrains Vagues.

Based upon the provenance for Factories at Asnières Seen from the Quai de Clichy (F317), the work was part of Père Tanguy's collection until 1894. Julien (Père) Tanguy sold art supplies and was an art dealer who took paintings as payment for paints, which Émile Bernard said made entering his shop in Montmartre, full of Impressionist paintings, like "visiting a museum". When Tanguy died in 1894, his friends staged an auction for his widow.

==== Factory at Asnières ====
Van Gogh was identified as one of the first, with other Impressionist and post-Impressionist painters, to depict industrial landscapes such as The Factory at Asnières (F318) Armand Guillaumin's Sunset at Ivry made in 1873 is another example.

== See also ==
- List of works by Vincent van Gogh
