= Outskirts of Paris (Van Gogh) =

Painting by Vincent van Gogh

Outskirts of Paris: Road with Peasant Shouldering a Spade
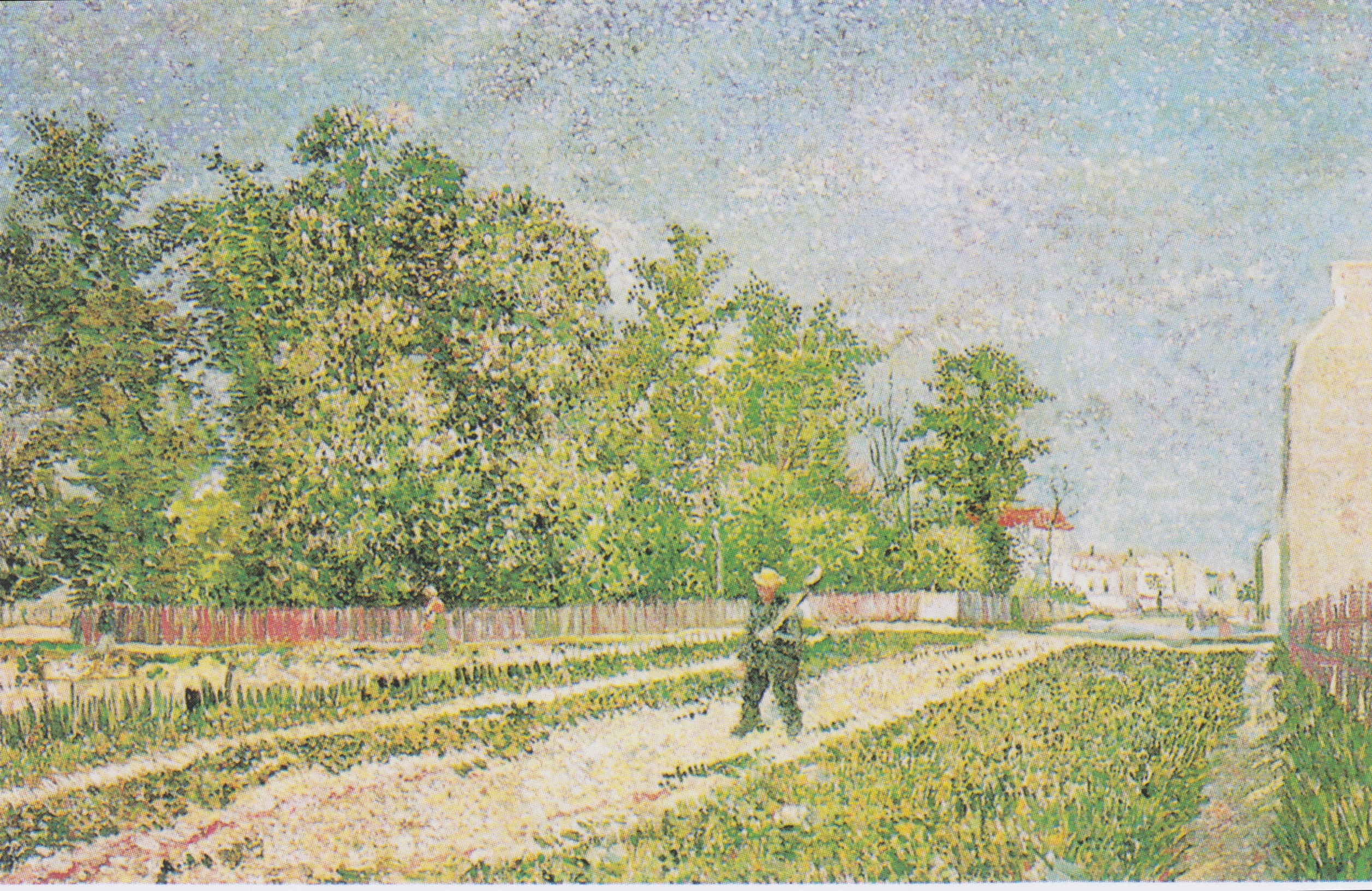
- Artist: Vincent van Gogh
- Year: 1887
- Catalogue: F361; JHJH1260
- Medium: Oil on canvas
- Dimensions: 48 cm × 73 cm (19 in × 29 in)
- Location: Private collection (F361)

Outskirts of Paris are paintings that Vincent van Gogh made in 1887, while he was living in Paris with his brother Theo.

== Outskirts of Paris, pastoral settings ==
Van Gogh liked to explore the outskirts of Paris, searching for pastoral settings in parks and the wooded areas of the suburbs. His goal was to find scenes that would allow him to explore techniques he learned in Paris.

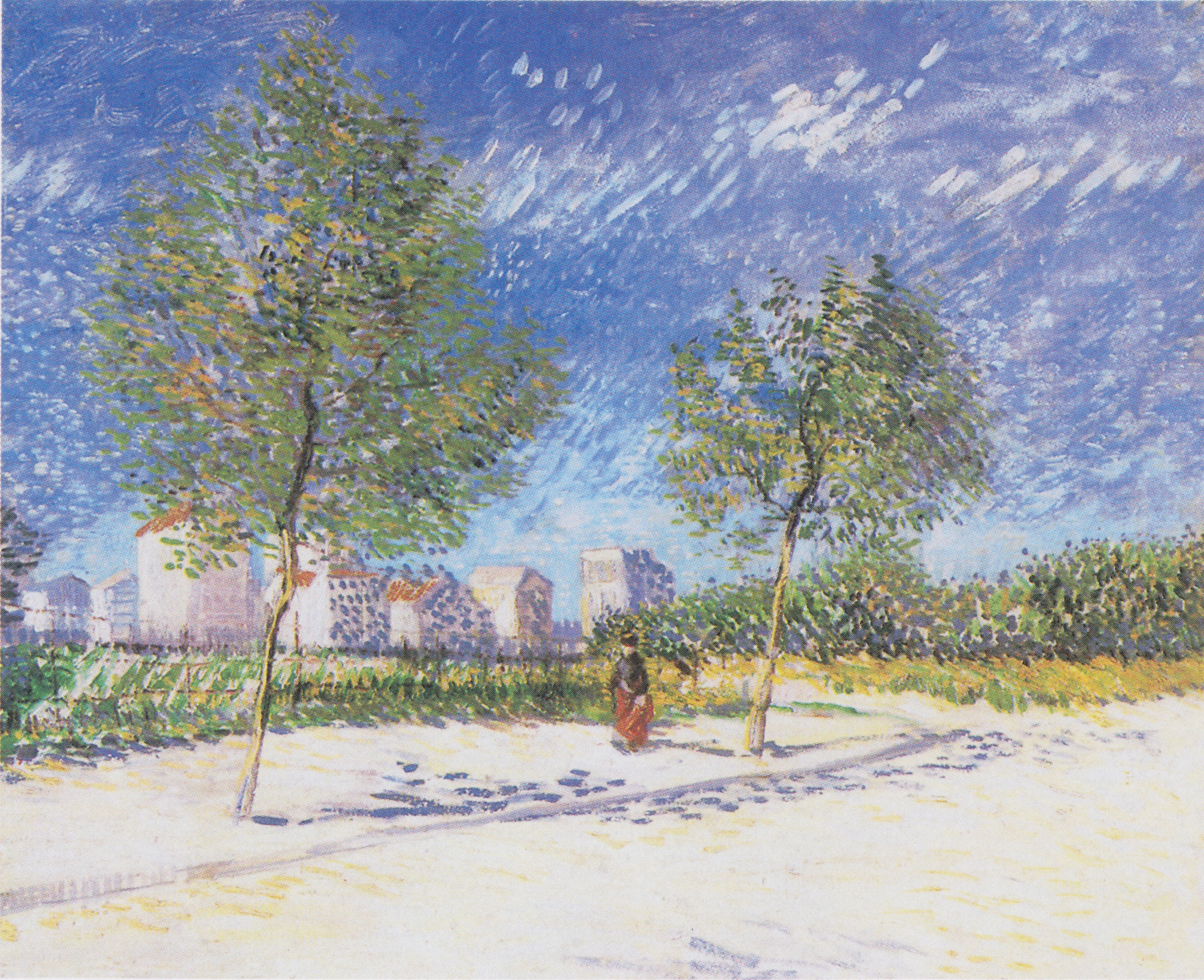
On the Outskirts of Paris
1887
Private Collection (F351)

== Outskirts of Paris, effects of industrialization ==
Like many Impressionsits, Van Gogh was concerned about the way in which the landscape and way of life were affected by technical progress and industrialization. He felt the concern back in the Netherlands, which he expressed to Anthon van Rappard, "I remember as a boy seeing that heath and the little farms, the looms and the spinning wheels in exactly the same way as I see them now in Anton Mauve’s and Adam Frans van der Meulens’ drawings... But since then that part of Brabant with which I was acquainted has changed enormously in consequence of agricultural developments and the establishment of industries. Speaking for myself, in certain spots I do not look without a little sadness on a new red-tiled tavern, remembering a loam cottage with a moss-covered thatched roof that used to be there. Since then there have come beet-sugar factories, railways, agricultural developments of the heath, etc., which is infinitely less picturesque."

One of the versions of Outskirts of Paris (F264) illustrates the encroachment of urban expansion to the pastoral life. To Van Gogh, industrialization meant loss of a revered lifestyle, the simple life of the peasant. Paul van der Griip, author of "Art and Exoticism: An Anthropology of the Yearning for Authenticity", wrote of Van Gogh's intention to portray his message of concern, "In his representations of the city he mainly paid attention to the expanding outskirts which swallowed up the countryside, whereby city and country life were often juxtaposed, sometimes in the form of trains for factories blotting the countryside."

Of Van Gogh's painting Outskirts of Paris (F264), Schwartz and Przyblyski write that although Van Gogh provides dots of color in a bleak terrain, "The factories - for that is what those lumpish buildings are - will replace the windmill, and the villas will march across the mud and cornfields until they reach the premonitory gas standard."

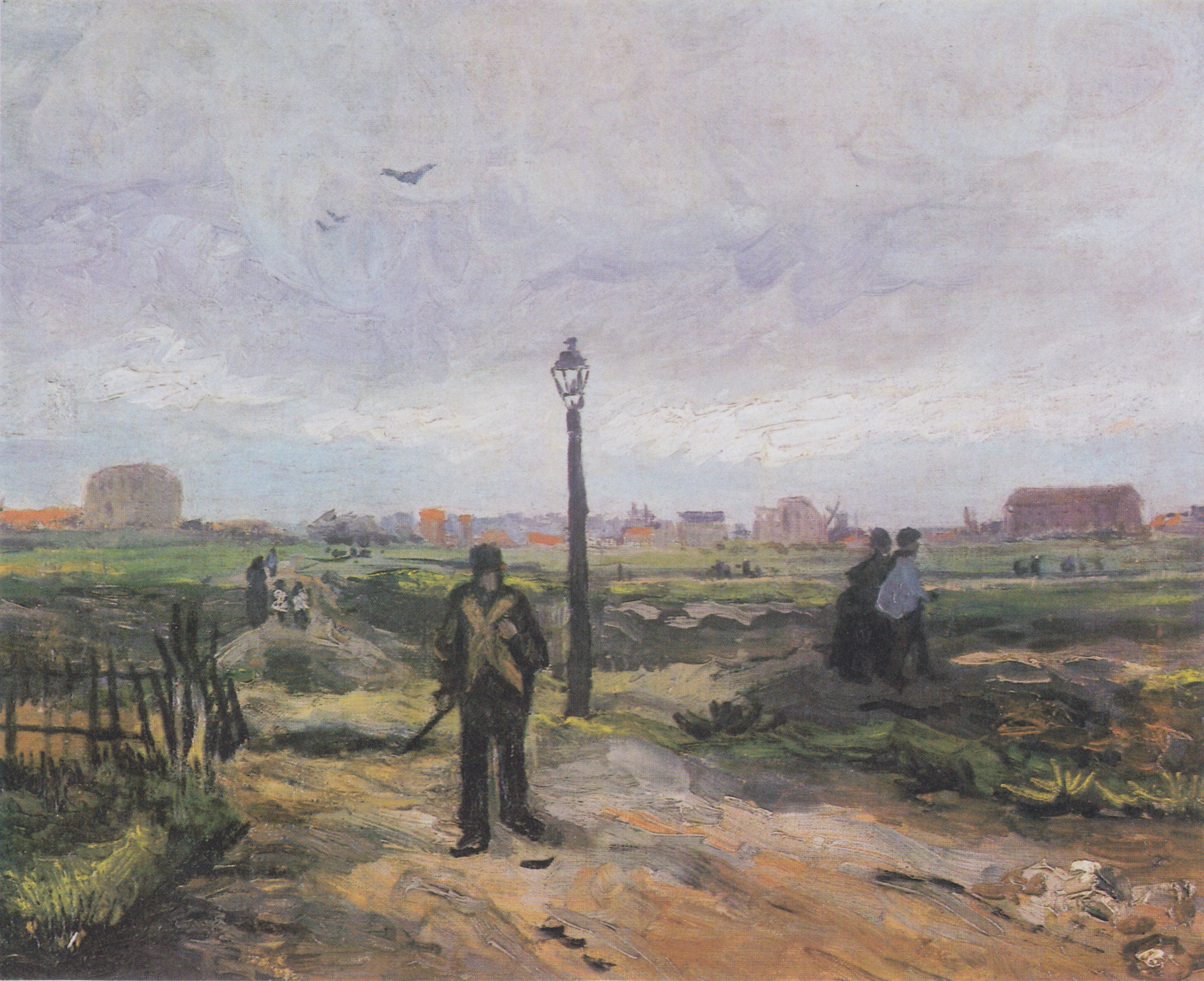
On the Outskirts of Paris
1887
Santa Barbara Museum of Art, California (F264)

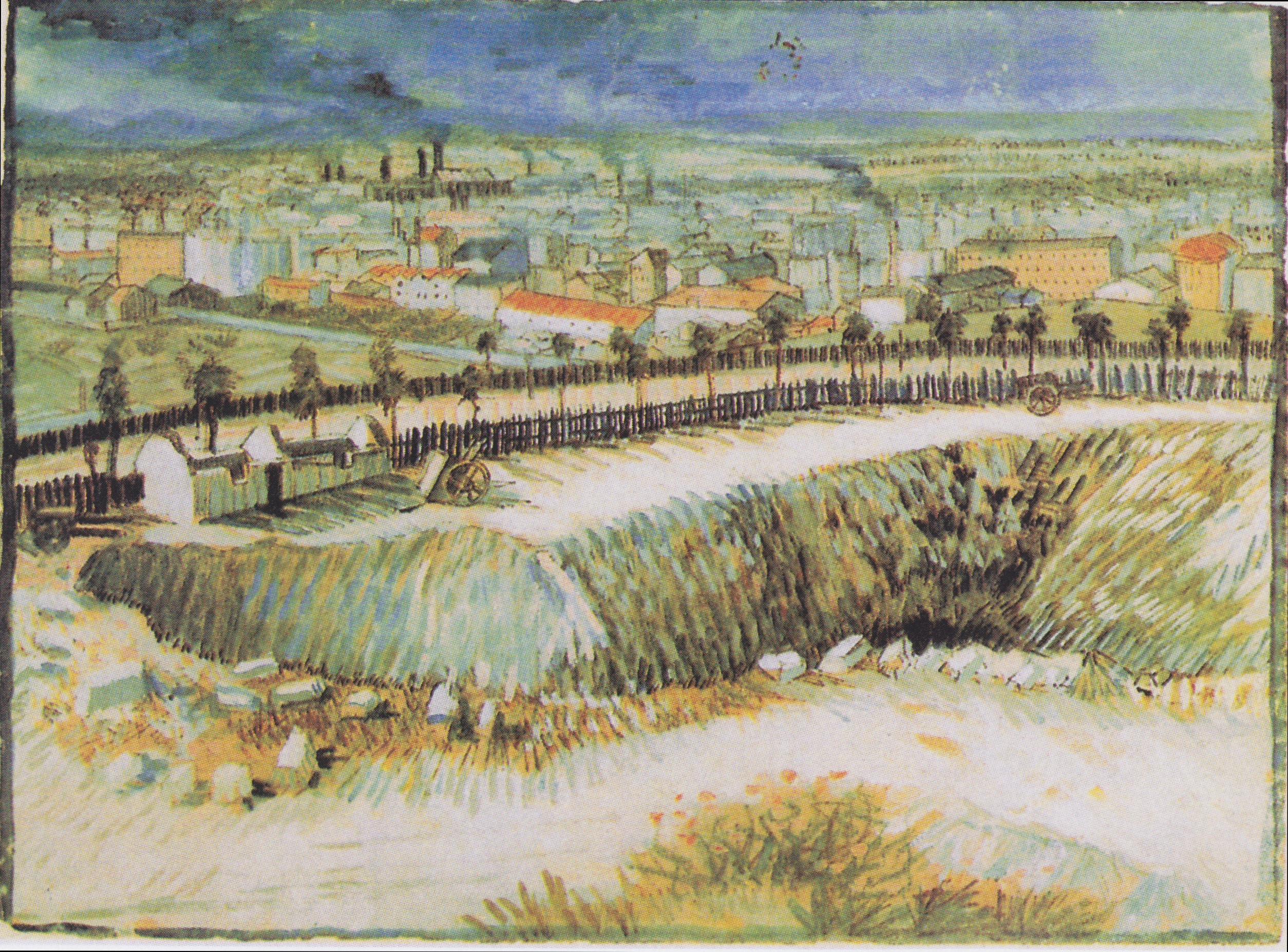
Outskirts of Paris near Montmartre, watercolor, 1887, Stedelijk Museum, Amsterdam (F1410)

== See also ==
- List of works by Vincent van Gogh
