= Fauché =

Fauché or Fauche is a French surname. Notable people with the surname include:

- Christelle Fauche, Swiss tennis player
- Daniel Fauché (born 1966), French rower
- Léon Fauché (1868–1950), French painter
- Louis Fauche-Borel (1762–1829), French counter-revolutionary
