= Memory of the Garden at Etten (Ladies of Arles) =

Oil painting by Vincent van Gogh

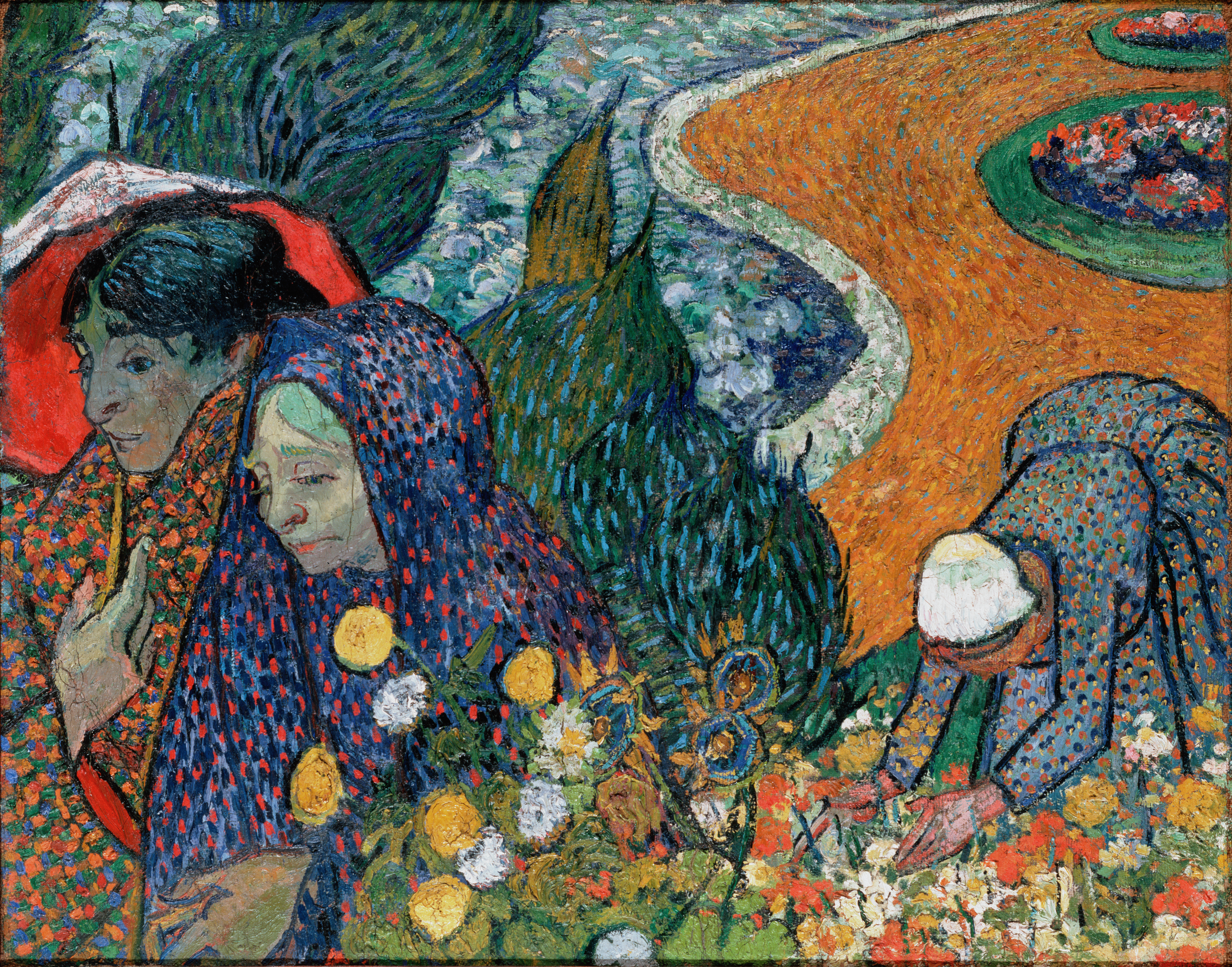
- Artist: Vincent van Gogh
- Year: 1888
- Catalogue: F496; JH1630
- Medium: Oil on canvas
- Dimensions: 73.5 cm × 92.5 cm (29 in × 36.5 in)
- Location: Hermitage; St. Petersburg
- Website: Museum page

Memory of the Garden at Etten (Ladies of Arles) is an oil painting by Vincent van Gogh. It was executed in Arles around November 1888 and is in the collection of the Hermitage Museum. It was intended as decoration for his bedroom at the Yellow House.

== Background ==
The "Garden at Etten" refers to the parsonage garden at Etten (now Etten-Leur) which Vincent's father, pastor Theodorus van Gogh, visited in 1875. Vincent spent periods of time there, notably from Easter to Christmas 1881 when he returned to join his brother Theo, an art dealer, determined to become an artist. This period at Etten represents the beginning proper of Vincent's ten-year career as an artist. He had drawn since boyhood, and the previous year had enrolled in a beginners' class in Brussels where he met the painter Anthon van Rappard, but he now began to draw in earnest. He rapidly developed an accomplished technique in landscape drawing but remained rather more uncertain in his figure drawing, which he practised assiduously with the aid of Charles Bargue's drawing course. Rappard made a twelve-day visit during this time, and they sketched together in the marshes and heaths round Etten. Vincent also visited his cousin-in-law Anton Mauve in The Hague, a celebrated artist of the time, who had expressed an interest in his drawings and who encouraged him further. At this time Vincent had not progressed as far as painting, though he did wash some of his drawings with watercolor. At the end of the year he made an extended visit to Mauve, who introduced him to painting. He returned to Etten with the intention of setting up a studio there.

That summer Vincent became infatuated with his recently widowed cousin Kee Vos-Stricker, daughter of the theologian Johannes Stricker, who had been invited to stay over the summer with her eight-year-old son Jan. Vincent had last visited her in Amsterdam some three years before while her husband was still alive (there is a family photo extant dating from 1872 thought to show Vincent side by side with Kee), but now her new situation stirred his tender feelings and romantic disposition. They took pleasant walks together and within the fortnight Vincent proposed marriage. She famously rebuffed him with a curt "No, at no time, never", abruptly taking her leave for Amsterdam and never dealing with him again. Vincent's obsessive attempts to press his suit eventually became a matter of family scandal, culminating in a bitter quarrel with his father on Christmas Day and his leaving the family home to set up his proposed studio in The Hague instead.

Vincent subsequently painted in Drenthe, Nuenen (his last family home), and Antwerp, before joining Theo in Paris in 1886, Finally he set up a studio in 1888 at the Yellow House in Arles, where he was joined by Paul Gauguin, with the intention of forming an artists' commune.

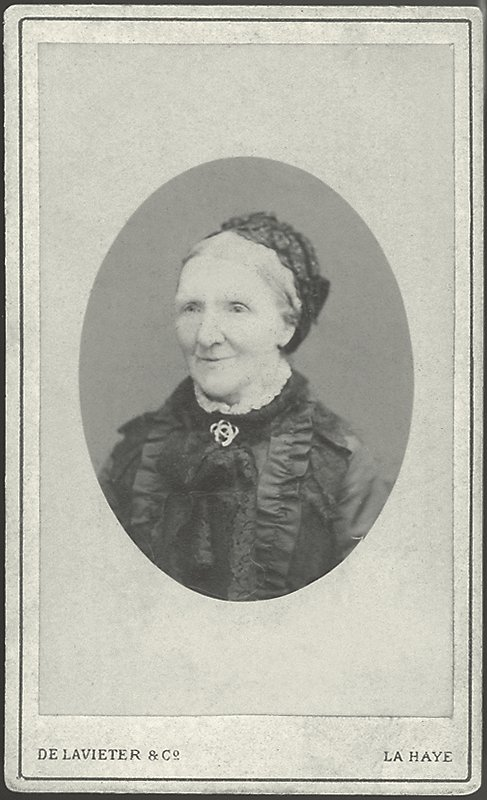
Anna van Gogh Carbentus (Vincent's mother), before 1888. This photo was the source for Vincent's Portrait of the Artist's Mother (F477 JH1600).

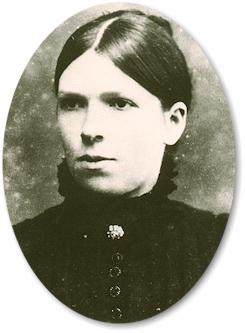
Willemien Jacoba van Gogh (Vincent's youngest sister), c 1881. Believed to be the source for the sketch F849 JH11.

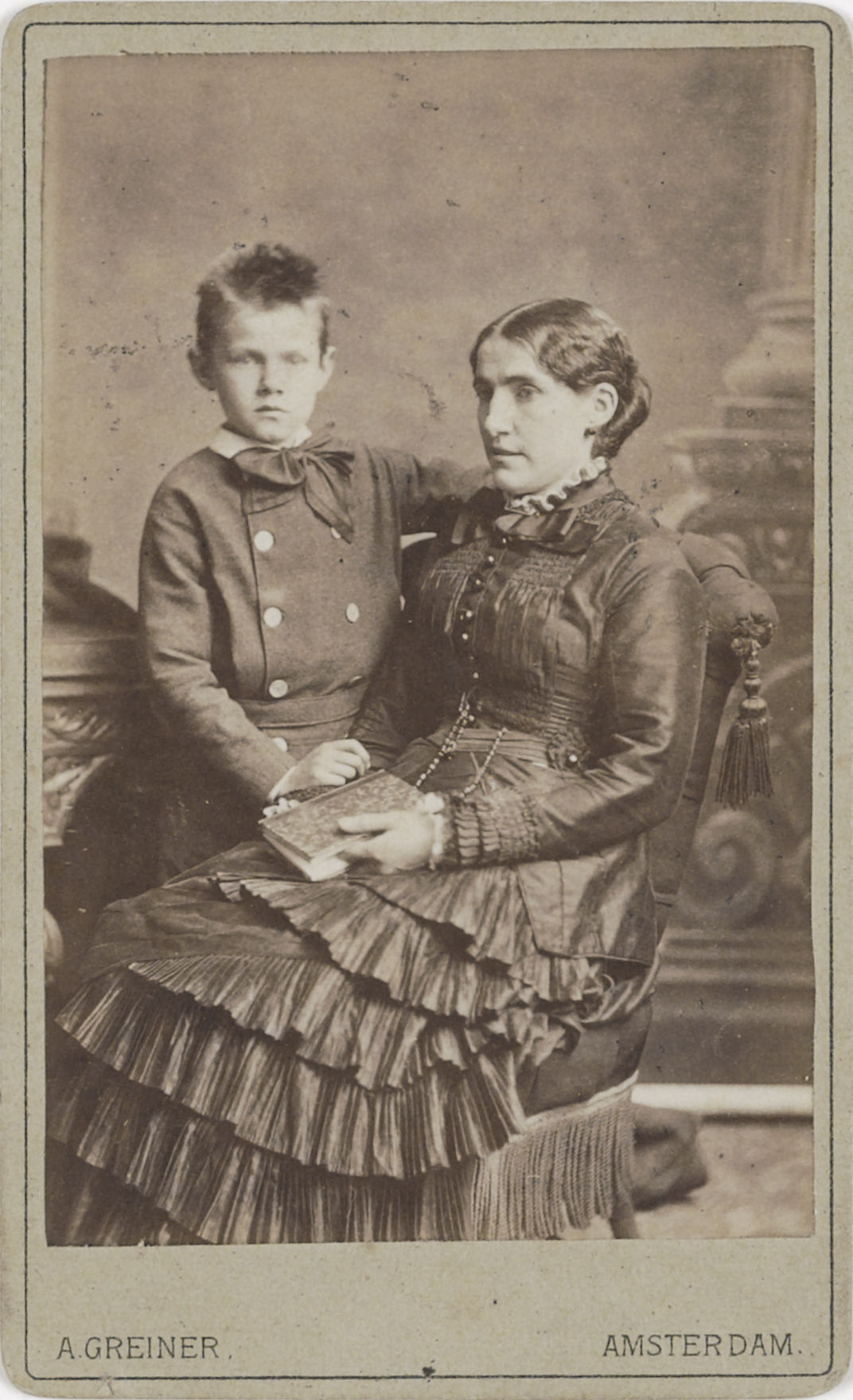
Kee Vos-Stricher (Vincent's recently widowed cousin and an unrequited love), with her eight-year-old son Jan, c 1881.

== History ==
The painting influenced Gauguin's Arlésiennes (Mistral) painted about a month later. In his letters about the painting Vincent makes it clear he was at pains to use his imagination in the way Gauguin was countenancing.

In Gauguin's painting the figure of the older woman is recognisably Madame Ginoux who ran the Café de la Gare where Vincent had lodged and which he and Gauguin continued to patronise after moving into the nearby Yellow House. Vincent's figures are generally taken to be his mother and sister Willemien. Vincent 's biographer Marc Edo Tralbaut, however, was of the opinion that the younger woman was, consciously or unconsciously, a representation of Kee Vos Stricker. Vincent was somewhat enigmatic on the subject in a letter to his sister:

I’ve already replied to you that I didn’t like Mother’s portrait enormously. I’ve now just painted a reminiscence of the garden at Etten, to put in my bedroom, and here’s a croquis of it. It’s quite a big canvas.
Now here are the colours. The younger of the two women walking is wearing a Scottish shawl with green and orange checks and carrying a red parasol. The old one has a blue-violet shawl, almost black. But a bunch of dahlias, some lemon yellow, others variegated pink and white, explode against this sombre figure.
Behind them a few emerald-green cedar or cypress bushes. Behind these cypresses one catches a glimpse of a bed of pale green and red cabbages, surrounded by a border of little white flowers. The sandy path is a raw orange, the foliage of two beds of scarlet geraniums is very green. Finally, in the middle ground is a maidservant dressed in blue who’s arranging plants with a profusion of white, pink, yellow and vermilion-red flowers.
There you are, I know it isn’t perhaps much of a resemblance, but for me it conveys the poetic character and the style of the garden as I feel them.
In the same way, let’s suppose that these two women walking are you and our mother. Let’s even suppose then that there may be not the slightest, absolutely not the slightest vulgar and fatuous resemblance, the deliberate choice of colour, the dark violet violently blotched with the lemon yellow of the dahlias, suggests Mother’s personality to me.
The figure in the Scottish plaid with the orange and green checks standing out against the dark green of the cypress, this contrast even more exaggerated by the red parasol, gives me an idea of you, vaguely a figure like those in Dickens’s novels.
I don’t know if you’ll understand that one can speak poetry just by arranging colours well, just as one can say comforting things in music. In the same way the bizarre lines, sought out and multiplied, and snaking all over the painting, aren’t intended to render the garden in its vulgar resemblance but draw it for us as if seen in a dream, in character and yet at the same time stranger than the reality.

In a later letter, he says he has spoiled the painting and refers to it as "that thing I did of the garden at Nuenen" (i.e. his later family home and not Etten), leading Hulsker to suggest he really had no particular location in mind. Hulsker is puzzled by the remark that Vincent thought he had spoiled the painting, describing the painting as fascinating and enigmatic, "rich in subdued yet sparkling colours". Both he and Tralbaut are reminded of medieval stained-glass windows.

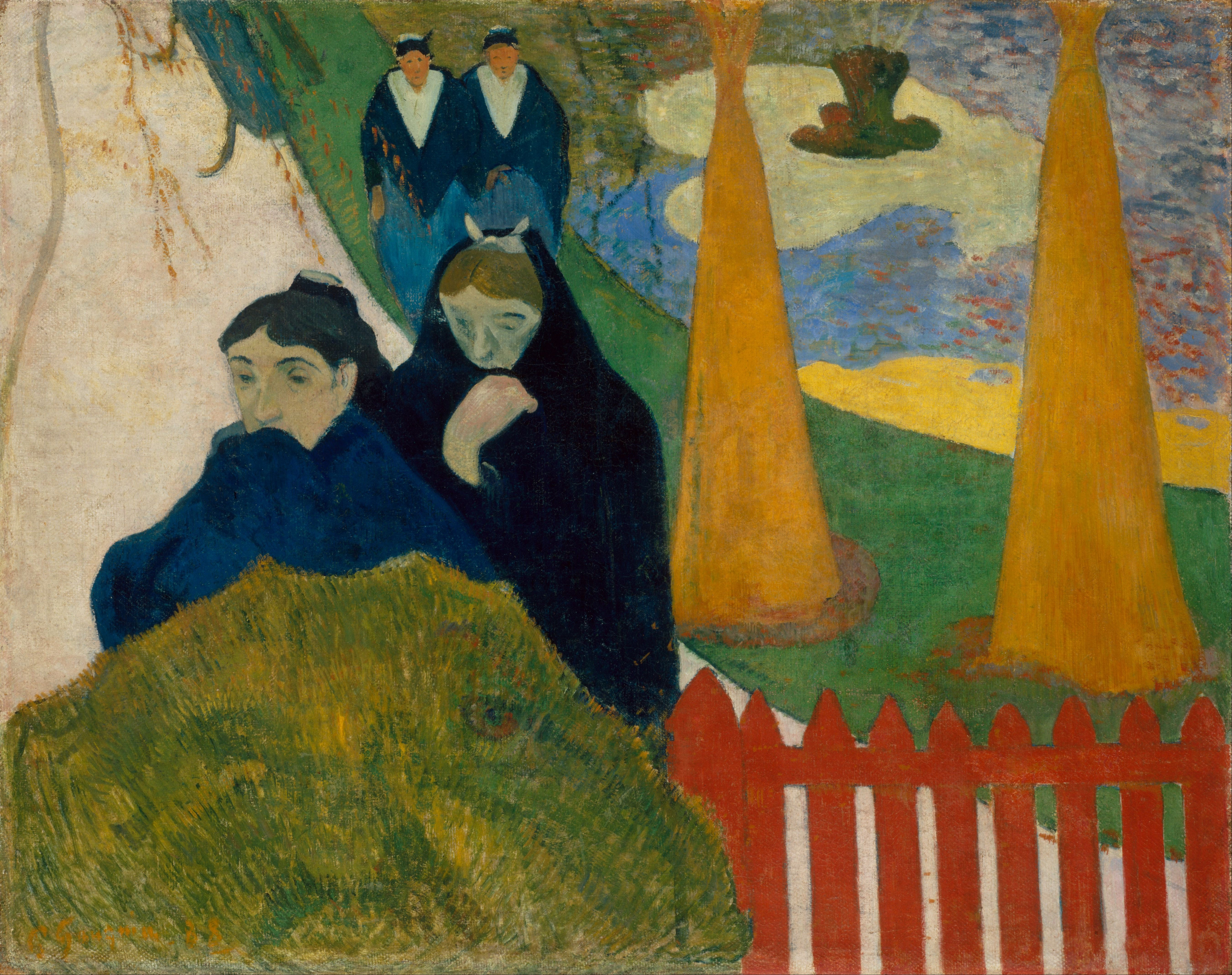
Paul Gauguin, Arlésiennes (Mistral), 1888, oil on jute, 73 × 92 cm, Art Institute of Chicago.

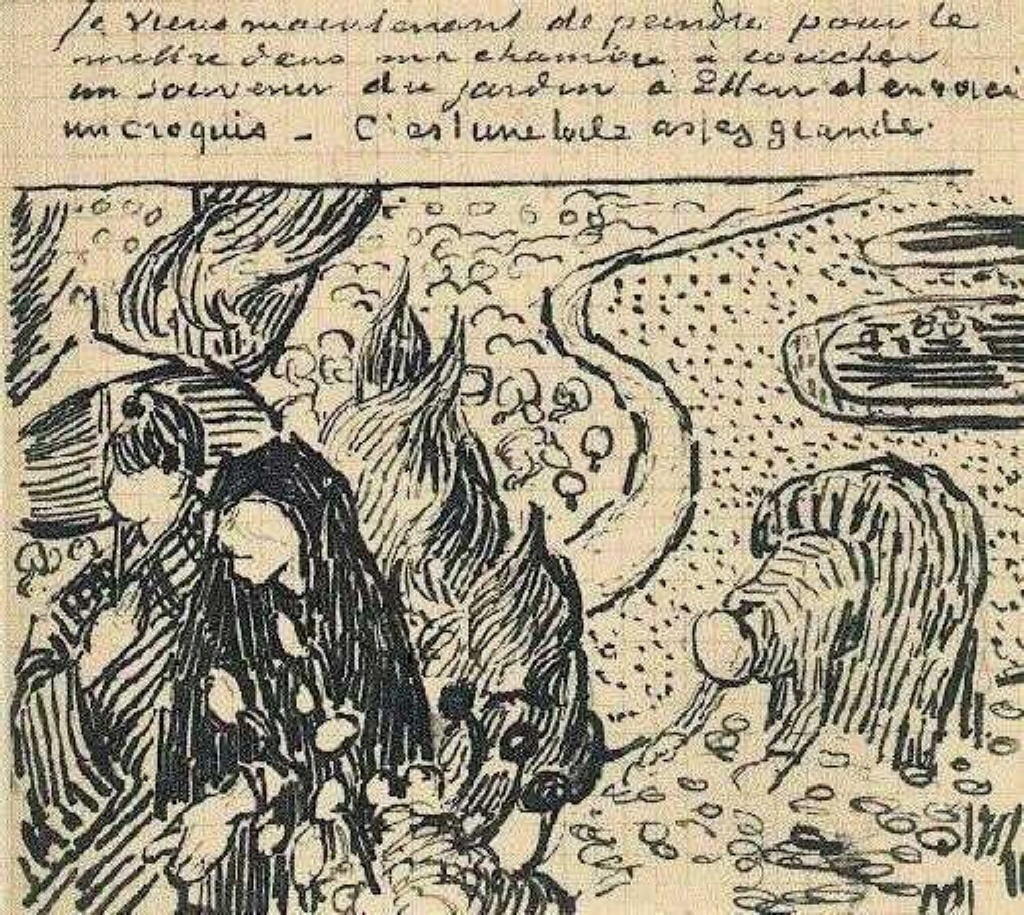
Vincent van Gogh, 1888, sketch in letter VGM 720 (W9), Van Gogh Museum, Amsterdam.

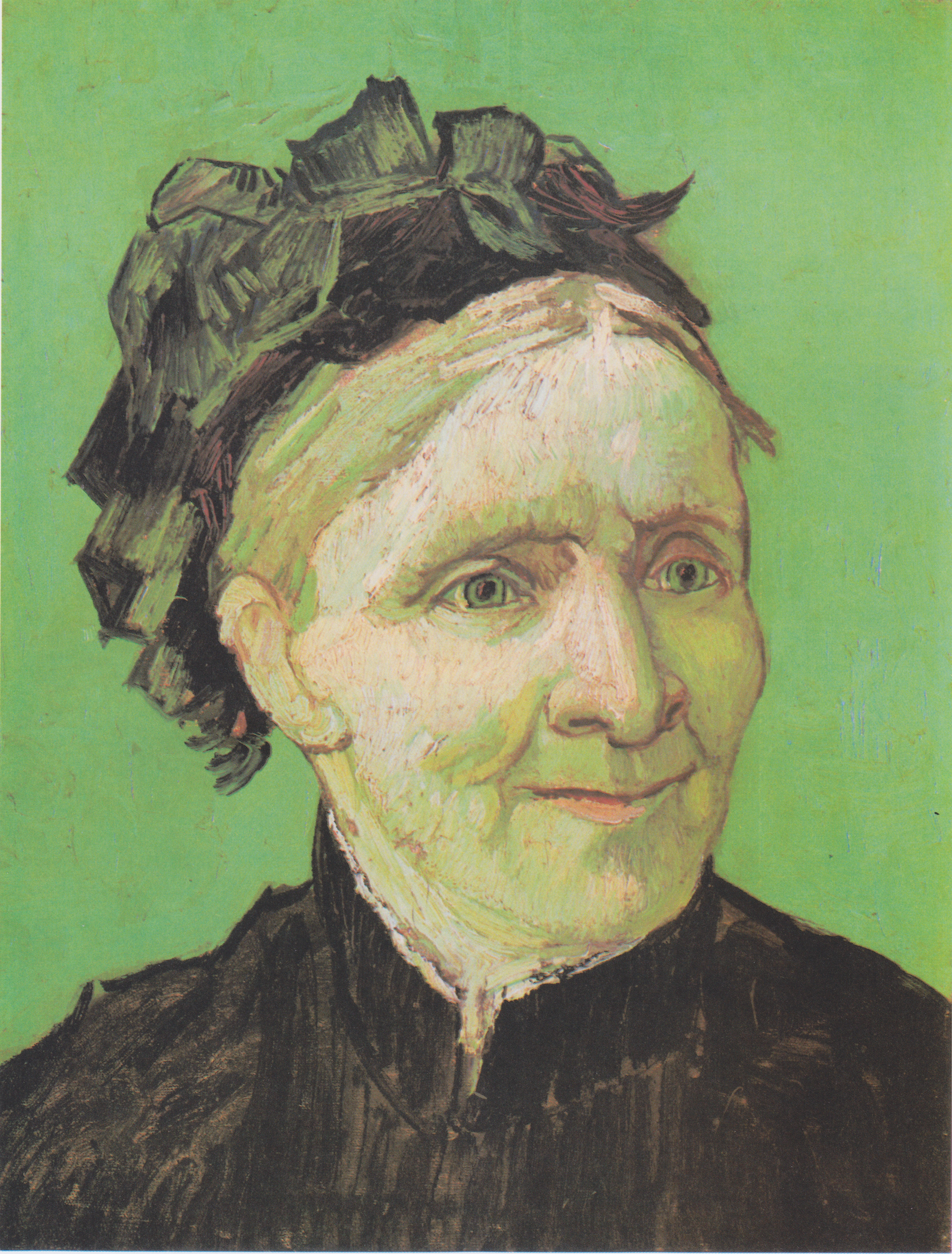
Vincent van Gogh, Portrait of the Artist's Mother (F477 JH1600), October 1888, oil on canvas, 40.5 × 32.5 cm, Norton Simon Museum.

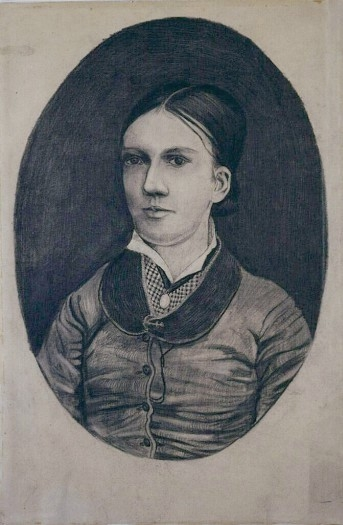
Vincent van Gogh, Portrait of Willemina van Gogh (F849 JH11), July 1881, black chalk and watercolor on pasted paper, 59.5 × 47 cm, Kröller-Müller Museum.

== Gauguin's influence ==
In his catalogue raisonné, Hulsker considers the claim that the radical changes now evident in Vincent's work were a result of Gauguin's influence and the Synthetic Symbolism style of painting, a fusion of Neo-Impressionism, Japonisme, and Pont Aven Symbolism, that he developed with Émile Bernard. In a collection of reminisces Avant et Après published 15 years later, Gauguin himself made the claim:

At the time I arrived in Arles, Vincent was full of Neo-Impressionism and was in serious trouble, which made him very sad; not that this school, like all other schools, was bad, but it simply did not suit his impatient and independent nature. With all his yellow on violet, all his painting with complementary colours, which he did in an unsystematic way, he got no further than incomplete, soft, monotonous harmonies; the clarion call was missing. I undertook the task of showing him the way, which I found easy, for I found rich and fertile soil. Like all original natures that show the stamp of personality, Vincent knew no fear and no obstinacy. From that day onward Vincent showed surprising progress; he appeared to discover what lay within him, hence that whole series of sunflowers after sunflowers in full sunshine.

Hulsker remarks that in reality Vincent was already in his prime as an artist when Gauguin arrived. For a while he was influenced by Gauguin's theory of painting from the imagination and Memory of the Garden at Etten is certainly a conscious effort to paint in this style, but he soon returned to Realism. As for the Sunflower paintings, those had been completed fully two months before Gauguin's arrival.

== Provenance ==
- Émile Schuffenecker, Clamart [recorded 1908]
- Sergei Shchukin, Moscow, cat 1913, nr 35
- Moscow, Museum of Modern Western Art [acquired 1918], cat 1928, nr 79
- Leningrad, Hermitage [acquired 1948], inv nr 9116, cat 1958, p 291 at 1967, nrs 65-66

== Exhibition history ==
- 1908 Paris (VvG, Galerie E. Druet, 6–18 January, 35 nrs), 30
- 1926 Moscow
- 1956 Moscow, Leningrad, p II
- 1960 Paris, 49

== See also ==
- List of works by Vincent van Gogh

== Notes ==
=== Bibliography ===
- Roland Dorn (1990). Décoration: Vincent van Goghs Werkreihe für das Gelbe Haus in Arles. Georg Olms Verlag. ISBN 978-3-487-09098-6.
- Gamboni, Dario, Paul Gauguin: The Mysterious Centre of Thought, 2014. ISBN 978-1780234083
- Hulsker, Jan. The Complete Van Gogh. Oxford: Phaidon, 1980. ISBN 0-7148-2028-8
- Gayford, Martin. The Yellow House: Van Gogh, Gauguin, and Nine Turbulent Weeks in Provence. New York: Mariner Books, 2008. ISBN 0-618-99058-5
- Naifeh, Steven; Smith, Gregory White. Van Gogh: The Life. Profile Books, 2011. ISBN 978-1846680106
- Pomerans, Arnold. The Letters of Vincent van Gogh. Penguin Classics, 2003. ISBN 978-0140446746
- Tralbaut, Marc Edo 8 x Van Gogh; Vincent van Gogh et les Femmes (Antwerp: Pierre Peré, 1962)
- Tralbaut, Marc Edo. Vincent van Gogh, Macmillan, London 1969, ISBN 0-333-10910-4
