= Émile Schuffenecker =

French painter

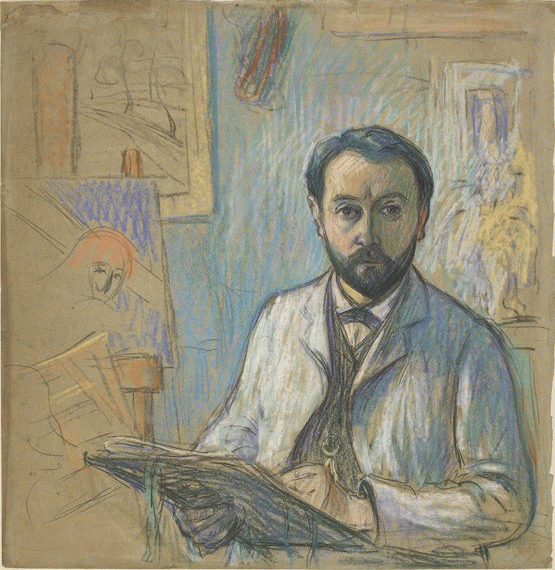
Self Portrait in the Studio (1889), pastel and crayon. Collection the Musée d'Orsay

Claude-Émile Schuffenecker (8 December 1851 – 31 July 1934) was a French Post-Impressionist artist, painter, art teacher and art collector. A friend of Paul Gauguin and Odilon Redon, and one of the first collectors of works by Vincent van Gogh, Schuffenecker was instrumental in establishing The Volpini Exhibition, in 1889.

== Biography ==
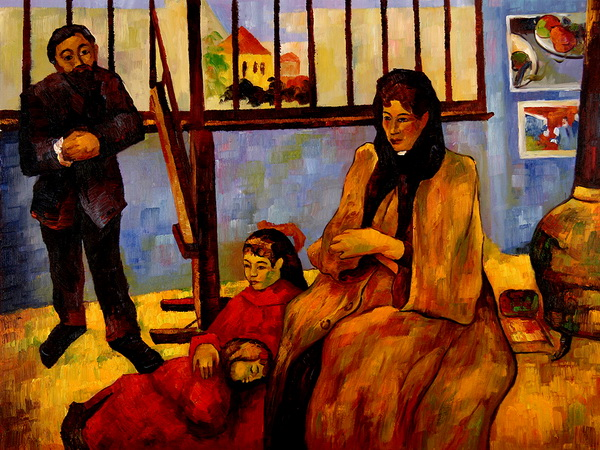
Paul Gauguin, The Schuffenecker Family (1889), Musée d'Orsay. Analysis of the painting has been seen as depicting tensions in Schuffenecker's marriage, which eventually disintegrated.

Claude-Émile Schuffenecker, son of Nicolas Schuffenecker (1829–1854) and Anne Monnet (1836–1907) was born in Fresne-Saint-Mamès (Haute-Saône). His father, a tailor originating from Guewenheim (Alsace, today Haut-Rhin), died when Émile was little more than two years old; the same year his brother Amédée was born in Charentenay (Haut-Rhin). The widow with her two boys moved to Meudon, close to Paris, where part of her mother's family lived, and where she had found work at a laundry. In the years to follow Émile was raised by his mother's sister, Anne Fauconnet Monnet, and her husband Pierre Cornu in Paris, educated by the Frères des Ecoles chrétiennes, and started work in his uncle's business, a chocolate and coffee-roasting facility in the Les Halles quarter.

On 28 February 1872, Schuffenecker joined the broker Bertin, where he met Paul Gauguin; they became close friends. Both used to study the Old Masters at the Louvre, and worked at the Académie Colarossi. In 1880, Schuffenecker married a cousin, Louise Lançon (1860-); their daughter Jeanne was born in 1882, their son Paul in 1884. In these years, however, the economic situation decreased. By 1880, both Schuffenecker and Gauguin evidently had gained enough money to leave Bertin—just in time before the French Panama Canal project began to turn into a disaster—and to try to stand on their own feet: Both opted for a career in the arts, and probably for additional income at the stock exchange. Then, in January 1882, the Paris Bourse crashed, and while Gauguin chose to remain independent, Schuffenecker decided to apply for the diploma to teach. Two years later, he was appointed to teach drawing at the Lycée Michelet in Vanves, with the painter Louis Roy as a collegial friend.

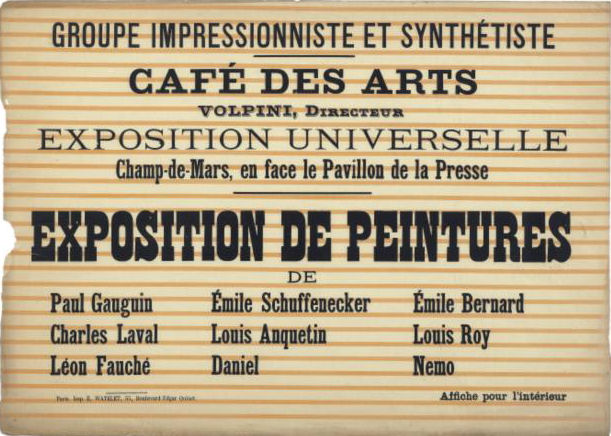
Poster of the 1889 Exhibition of Paintings by the Impressionist and Synthetist Group, at Café des Arts, known as The Volpini Exhibition, 1889

Much has been said about Gauguin's portrait of "le bon Schuff" and his family, painted early in 1889 in Schuffenecker's studio, soon after Gauguin's return from Arles: judging from Gauguin's portrait, the personal relations of the couple are widely considered to have been precarious. Since Gauguin's return from Denmark, in 1885, he had been welcome to stay at Schuffenecker's, but soon after his return from Brittany in 1890, Gauguin was asked to find a place elsewhere. Rumours (most probably initiated by Émile Bernard) spread that Schuffenecker had been betrayed by his wife, and for years, he separated himself from his family, until in 1899, his wife demanded a divorce and won the right of custody over their children.

He left the Lycée in 1914.

Schuffenecker died in Paris, 33 rue Olivier de Serres, on July 31, 1934, and was buried at the Montparnasse cemetery on 3 August.

== Artist ==
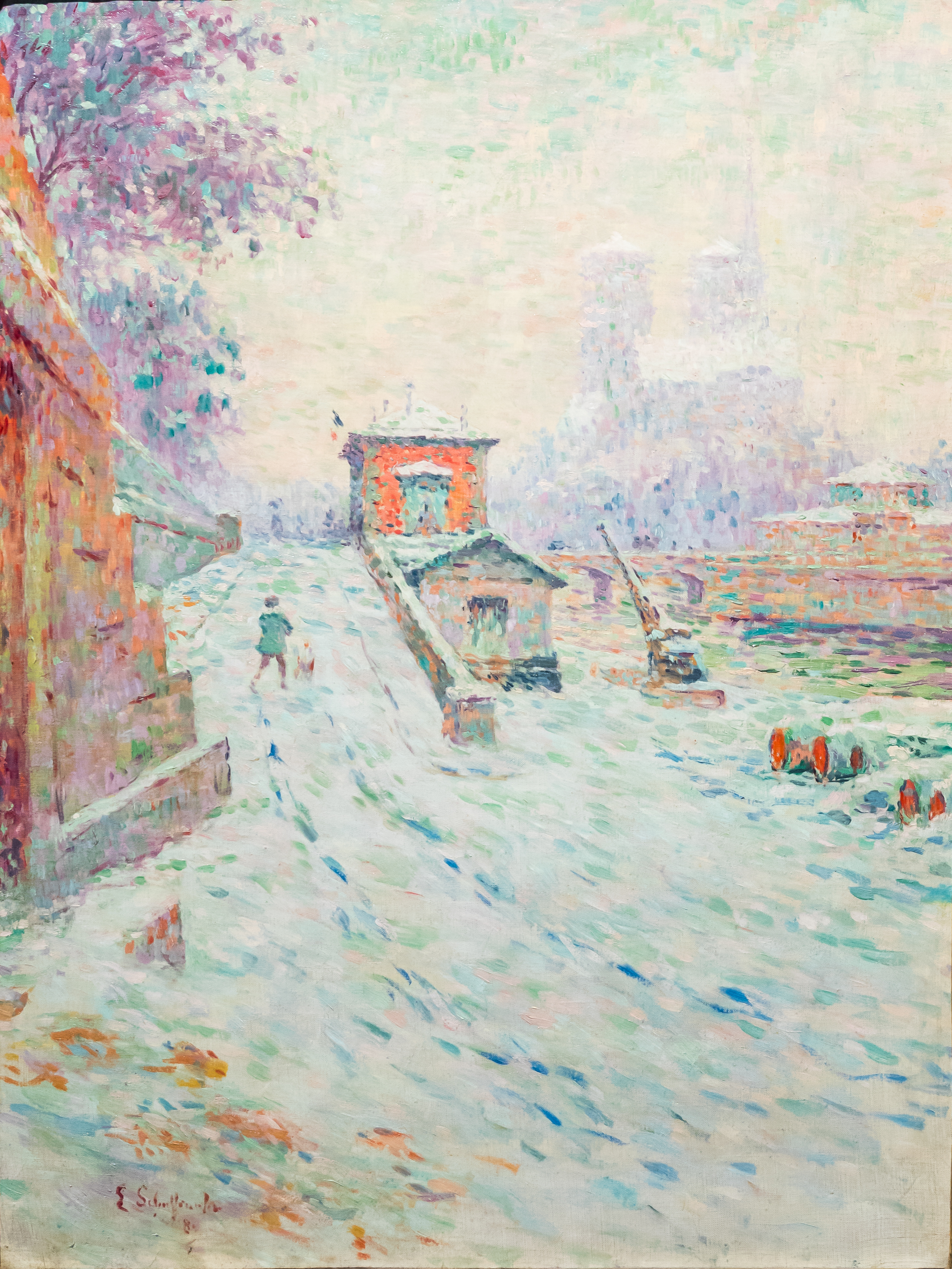
Emile Schuffenecker: Notre-Dame de Paris, 1889, 73 x 54 cm, Wallraf-Richartz-Museum / Fondation Corboud, Cologne

Together with Gauguin, Schuffenecker was trained at the Académie Suisse, in 1872, and at the Académie Colarossi, in 1883—but his point of depart was, in 1866, the private atelier of Paul Baudry. In 1869 he received a "first-class mention in design" as a pupil of Father Athanase, and from 1872 to 1881, he continued his training with Carolus-Duran, admittance to the annual Salon included. In 1882 and 1883, however, his paintings were refused by the Salon jury. So Schuffenecker, in 1884, joined the Société des Artistes Indépendants and, in 1886, the Impressionists in their 8th and final exhibition.

== Art collector ==
Jean de Rotonchamp, Gauguin's first biographer, described Schuffenecker's collection at 14, rue Durand-Claye, in 1906: Besides paintings by Gauguin such as The Yellow Christ and some of his ceramics, there were works by Cézanne, including a female portrait, and several works by Vincent van Gogh, a Postman, an Olive orchard in Provence, The Good Samaritan, an Arlésienne and a version of the Sunflowers. Ukiyo-e prints and some Redon complete Rotonchamp's survey.

== Alleged forgery ==
Since the late 1920s, Schuffenecker is suspected to have imitated the work of other contemporary artists including Vincent van Gogh. When the Wacker scandal emerged and Schuffenecker's name was dropped, cautious voices already claimed that a young Swiss artist (!) inspired by Van Gogh cannot be blamed.

Some sketches and drawings prove that Schuffenecker carefully studied works by Van Gogh in his possession. But there is also evidence that Schuffenecker went a step further and "completed" paintings he considered to be unfinished. In 1927, he himself frankly admitted to having "finished" the Large Tree at Montbriand, then in the collection of Maurice Gangnat, as well as other works by Paul Cézanne: a landscape from L'Estaque as well as a portrait of his wife, and a view of the pool at the Jas de Bouffan. Presumably, Schuffenecker also embellished versions of Van Gogh's Sunflowers and Daubigny's Garden slightly, both since 1894 in his possession. This was possibly done simply to adapt a painting to a frame he had at hand, which is the reason he mentioned to Maximilien Gauthier.

But up to now, it has never been established that Schuffenecker indeed forged, comprising the intention to betray. Jill-Elyse Grossvogel stated in the preface to her catalogue raisonné: "We can now confirm the fact, based on the most recent research, that Schuffenecker did no forgeries of Van Gogh's paintings prior to 1900. It is too soon to specify titles and dates of forged works post-1900 until additional evidence is carefully reviewed."
