= The Schuffenecker Family =

Painting by Paul Gauguin

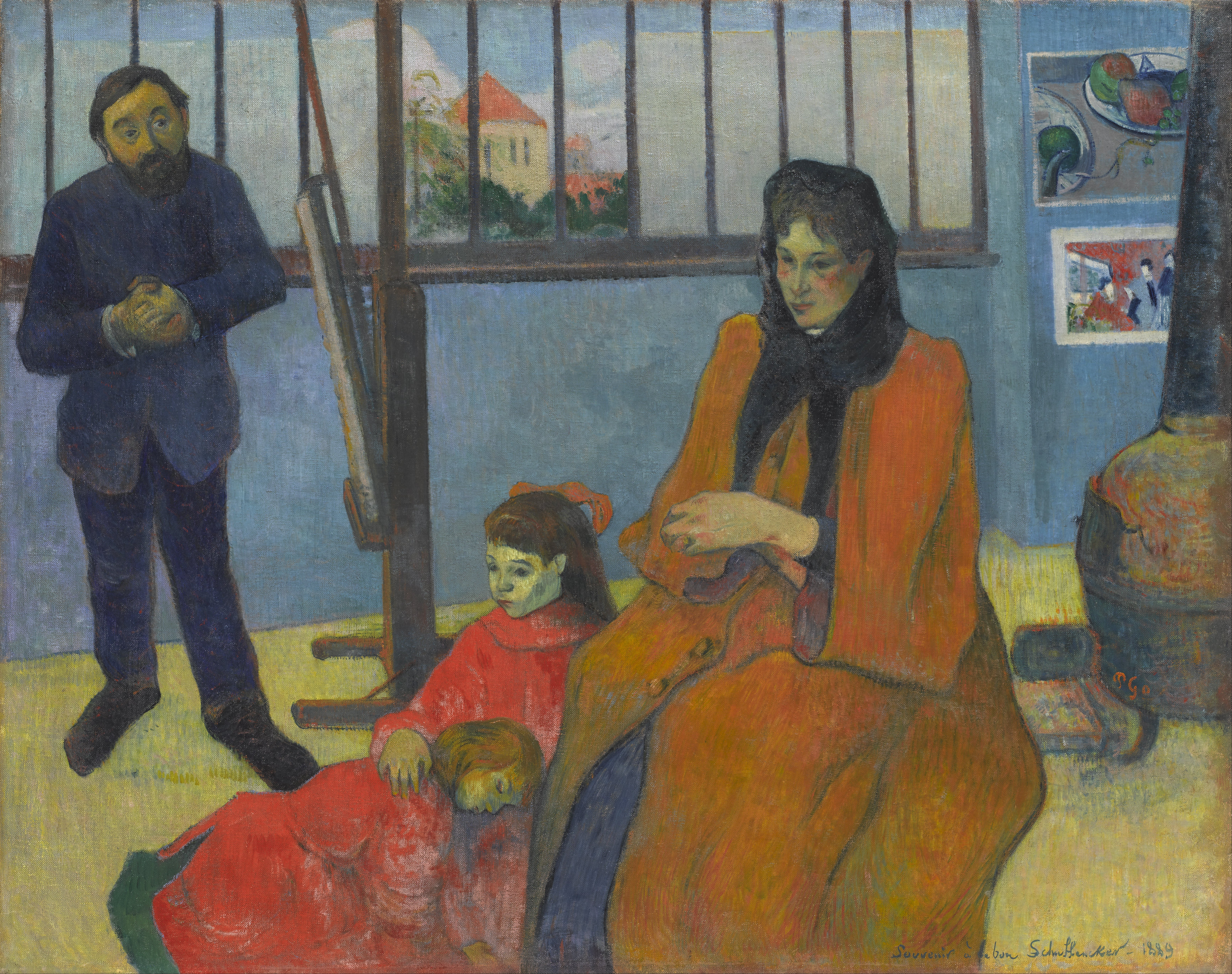
- Artist: Paul Gauguin
- Year: 1889
- Medium: oil on canvas
- Dimensions: 73 cm × 92 cm (29 in × 36 in)
- Location: Musée d'Orsay; Paris

The Schuffenecker Family or Schuffenecker's Studio is an 1889 oil on canvas painting by Paul Gauguin, now in the Musée d'Orsay. It shows the artist's painter friend Émile Schuffenecker with his wife Louise Lançon and their two children Jeanne (born 1882) and Paul (born 1884). On the wall to the right of the window is a still-life with fruits and a Japanese print, reflecting the then-fashionable Japonism.

== See also ==
- List of paintings by Paul Gauguin
