= Portrait of the Artist's Mother (Van Gogh) =

1888 painting by Vincent van Gogh

Portrait of Artist's Mother
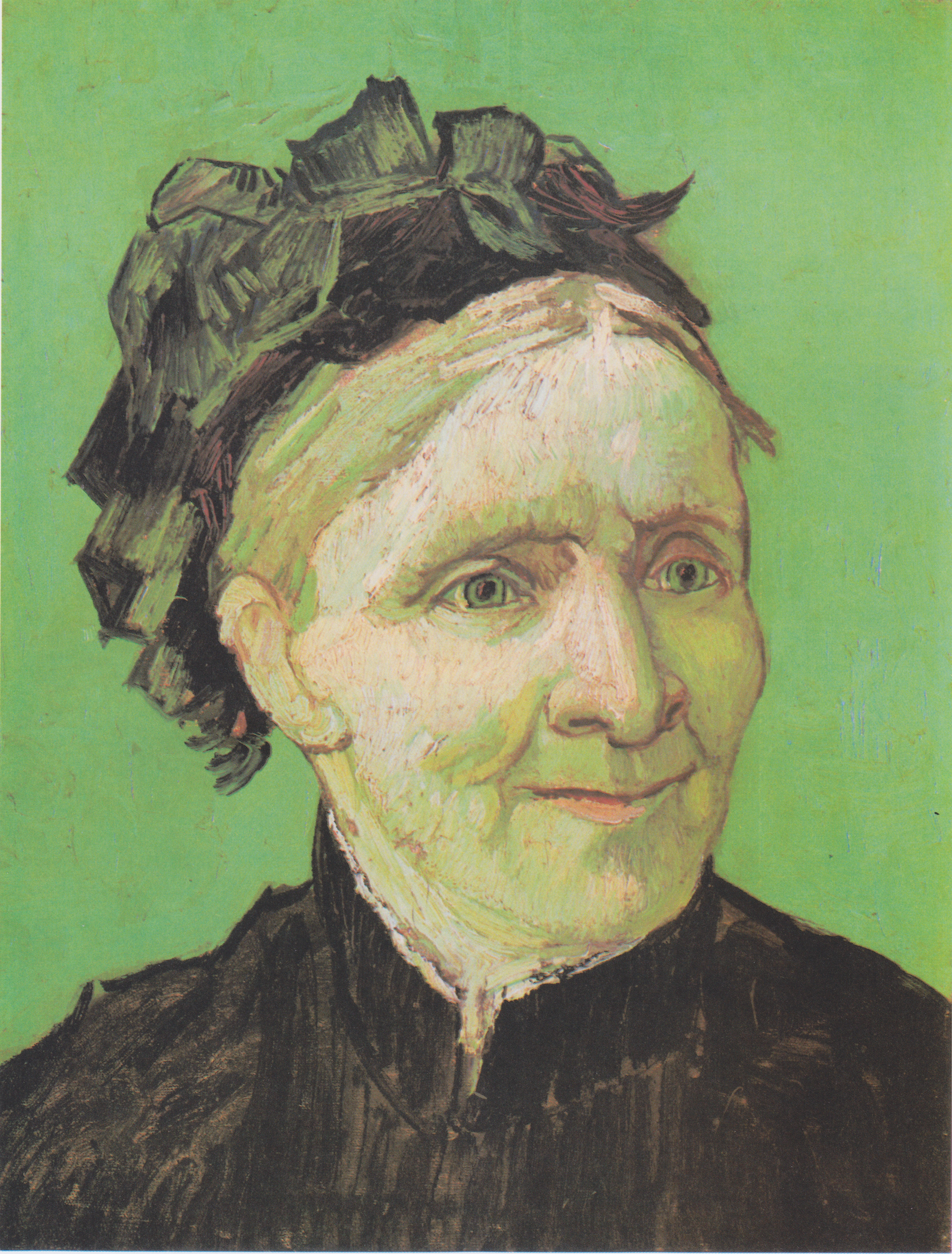
- Artist: Vincent van Gogh
- Year: October, 1888
- Catalogue: F477; JH1600
- Medium: Oil on canvas
- Dimensions: 40.5 cm × 32.5 cm (15.9 in × 12.8 in)
- Location: Norton Simon Museum of Art; Pasadena

Portrait of Artist's Mother is an 1888 painting by Vincent van Gogh of his mother, Anna Carbentus van Gogh, drawn from a black-and-white photograph. Van Gogh's introduction to art was through his mother, herself an amateur artist. After years of strained relations with family members, Van Gogh excitedly shared some of his works which he thought his mother would appreciate most: of flowers and natural settings. In this painting, Van Gogh captures his mother's dignified and proud nature. It was painted at almost the same time, and with a very similar palette of colours and pose as his Self Portrait (Dedicated to Paul Gauguin)

== Background ==
Anna Carbentus van Gogh was an amateur artist who enjoyed making drawings of plants and flowers and was a "keen watercolorist". At the same time, it should be recognized that drawing and painting with watercolors was a common activity by the bourgeois strata at that time. From a large family, one of six children, Anna raised six children: Vincent, Anna, Elizabeth, Theo, Wilhelmien and Cornelius. Anna enjoyed sharing her love of art with her children. Among Vincent's earliest drawings are copies of his mother's sketches of a bouquet of flowers and thistles.

Anna's husband, Theodorus van Gogh, was a pastor, a long-standing family profession. Theodorus, known for his good looks and long sermons, came from a family of seven children. Anna and Theodorus devotedly served the rural communities in which they were stationed; their actions modeled their religious beliefs. Both mother and father believed that God was omnipotent, continually watching over them. They taught their children to look for God's presence in nature, such as the shape of the clouds or in the many colors in the sunsets. Theodorus van Gogh's favorite poet, Reverend Bernard ter Haar wrote in the poem "Song of Praise to Creation":

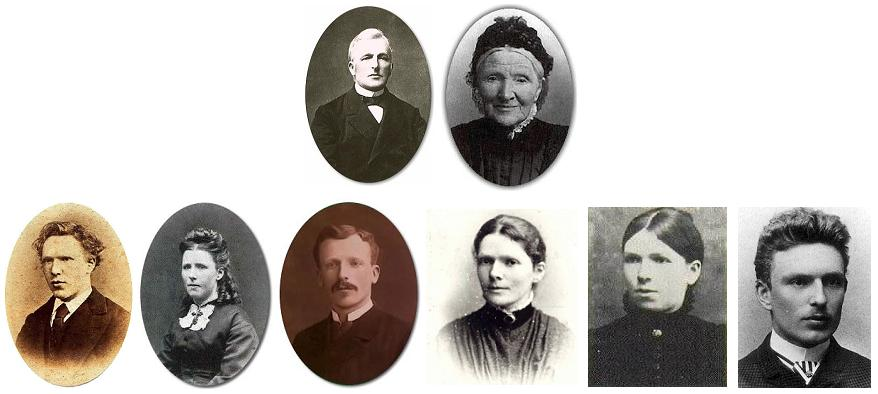
Theodorus and Anna van Gogh's family, including Vincent, Anna, Theo, Elizabeth, Wilhelmien and Cornelius

"I lose myself in you, Nature,
How my mental powers yield,
Around which the Universe turns,
Exclaim the glory of the centuries,
Proclaim!
Or — be quiet, my toy, be silent!
Hear what Creation
Is singing!
To fall silent is very meaningful here —
And might be called reverence."

At the age of eleven Van Gogh was sent to boarding schools for training, which initiated his lifelong feelings of exile. Van Gogh felt even more removed from the family after failing as an art dealer and in the ministry. When he decided to become an artist, his family members suggested possible alternate, more lucrative vocations which widened the division between Vincent and his family. Van Gogh's manner of dress, behavior and unusual love life was unsettling and embarrassing to the family. Vincent too felt a division. By 1881 Vincent had developed his personal view of the world and realized it was quite different than his parents. To his brother, Theo he wrote "I can't settle into Father's and Mother's system, it is too stifling and would suffocate me." He continues, "I find Father and Mother's sermons and ideas about God, people, morality and virtue a lot of stuff and nonsense."

When Vincent was hospitalized in Arles in 1888–1889, his mother wrote to Theo, "I believe he was always ill and his suffering and ours was a result of it. Poor brother of Vincent, sweetest dearest Theo, you to have been very worried and troubled because of him." She then said, "I would ask, 'Take him, Lord.'"

As Vincent rose to the height of his career, he enjoyed passing on prized paintings to his family. "Great bouquets of flowers, violet-colored irises, great bouquets of roses," went to his mother. Another example, "the most resolved and stylized of the three" paintings of women picking olives was made for his sister and mother.

== Description ==
Van Gogh set out to complete a series of portraits of his family. This portrait was based upon a black-and-white photograph of his mother. In a letter to his brother Theo, Van Gogh wrote, "I am doing a portrait of Mother for myself. I cannot stand the colorless photograph, and I am trying to do one in a harmony of color, as I see her in my memory." Van Gogh's mother appears to be a respectable middle-class woman, attentive and proud, against a green background.

== Memory of the Garden at Etten ==
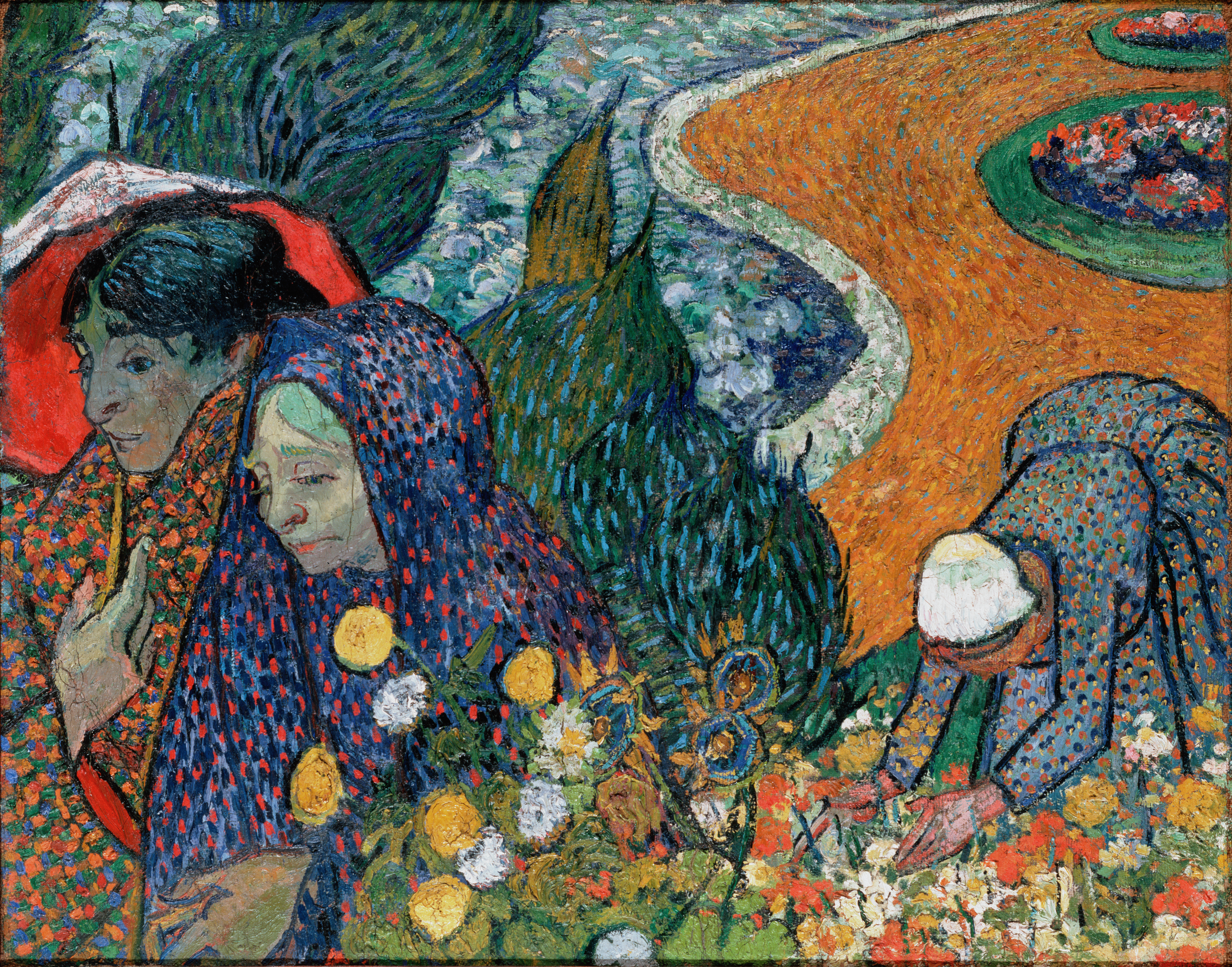
Memory of the Garden at Etten (Ladies of Arles), 1888. The Hermitage, St. Petersburg, Russia (F496)

Van Gogh painted Memory of the Garden at Etten to hang in his bedroom. He envisioned the older woman was his mother and the younger in a plaid shawl his sister Wil. To Wil he said he had "an impression of you like those in Dickens’s novels."

== Portraits ==
Van Gogh, known for his landscapes, seemed to find painting portraits his greatest ambition. He said of portrait studies, "the only thing in painting that excites me to the depths of my soul, and which makes me feel the infinite more than anything else." To his sister he wrote, "I should like to paint portraits which appear after a century to people living then as apparitions. By which I mean that I do not endeavor to achieve this through photographic resemblance, but my means of our impassioned emotions -- that is to say using our knowledge and our modern taste for color as a means of arriving at the expression and the intensification of the character."

As much as Van Gogh liked to paint portraits of people, there were few opportunities for him to pay or arrange for models for his work which may have been another factor in his desire to make a portrait of his mother.

== See also ==
- List of works by Vincent van Gogh

== Bibliography ==
- Gayford, M (2008) [2006]. The Yellow House: Van Gogh, Gauguin, and Nine Turbulent Weeks in Provence. Mariner Books. ISBN 978-0-618-99058-0.
- Greenberg, J; Jordan, S (2001). Vincent Van Gogh: Portrait of an Artist. New York: Delcorte Press. ISBN 978-0-307-54874-0.
- Leeuw, R (1997) [1996]. van Crimpen, H, Berends-Albert, M. ed. The Letters of Vincent van Gogh. London and other locations: Penguin Books.
- Mancoff, D (1999). Van Gogh: Fields and Flowers. San Francisco: Chronicle Books. ISBN 0-8118-2569-8.
- Silverman, D (2000). Van Gogh and Gauguin: The Search for Sacred Art. New York: Farrar, Straus and Giroux. ISBN 0-374-28243-9.
