= The Volpini Exhibition, 1889 =

Painting exhibition arranged by Paul Gaugin

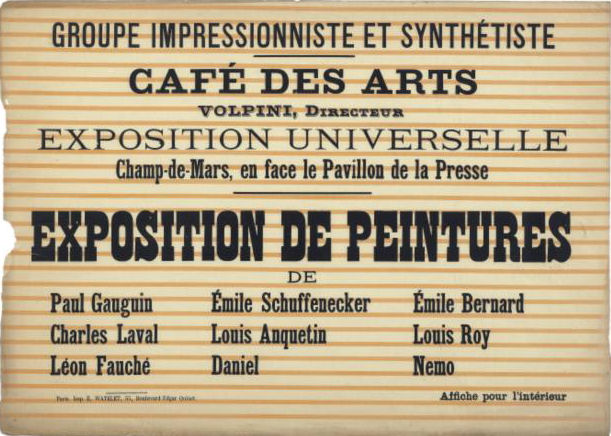
Poster of the 1889 exhibition by the "Impressionist and Synthetist Group", at the Café des Arts.

The Volpini Exhibition was an exhibition of paintings arranged by Paul Gauguin and his circle held at the Café des Arts on the Champ de Mars, not far from the official art pavilion of the 1889 Exposition universelle in Paris. A poster and an illustrated catalogue were printed, but the show of "Paintings by the Impressionist and Synthetist Group", held in June and early July 1889, was ignored by the press and proved to be a failure.

== Background ==
The official art exhibition at the Académie des Beaux-Arts accompanying the Exposition universelle displayed works by invited artists only, and the selection of works to be exhibited had to pass the judgement of official juries. Neither Gauguin nor his friends could hope to enter this exhibition. However, by chance Emile Schuffenecker found another way that they might present their work to the public in conjunction with the exposition. Monsieur Volpini, who had the contract for the Grand Café des Arts opposite the exhibition, had a problem: the mirrors he had ordered in Italy to decorate the interior of his café would not arrive in time for the opening of the exposition. Schuffenecker proposed that the gap could be filled with a display of paintings created by himself and his friends.

== Participation ==
Gauguin, through Schuffenecker, ensured that the Neo-Impressionists Georges Seurat, Paul Signac, Henri-Edmond Cross and Pissarro were excluded from the exhibition. He proposed to include:

- 10 paintings each, by Schuffenecker, Guillaumin, Gauguin and Bernard
- 2 paintings each by Roy and Fauché
- 6 paintings by van Gogh

Guillaumin and Theo van Gogh, acting for his brother Vincent, refused to participate, while Anquetin, Laval and Monfreid joined the group. Bernard split his contribution: two of his paintings were shown under the pseudonym Ludovic Nemo and described as peintures pètroles.

The final participation was:

- Paul Gauguin – 17 items
- Charles Laval – 10 items
- Léon Fauché – 5 items
- E. Schuffenecker – 20 items
- Louis Anquetin – 7 items
- Georges Daniel – 3 items
- Émile Bernard – 23 items
- Louis Roy – 7 items
- Ludovic Nemo – 2 items

== Catalogue layout and illustrations ==
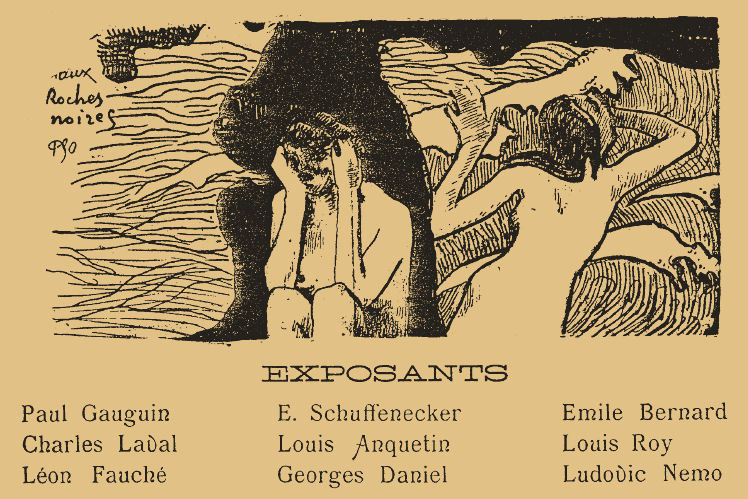
Paul Gauguin, Roches Noires Drawing, 1889, exhibition catalogue frontispiece

The catalogue for the exhibition had a somewhat idiosyncratic layout. The title page was followed by a list of contributing artists (Exposants) accompanied by a Gauguin drawing titled Aux Rochers noires. The drawing was a conflation of two of his exhibited paintings, Breton Eve and In the Waves. The next double-page lists Gauguin's contribution (nos. 31–47) and reproduces Gauguin's Les Faneuses, and the one following Schuffenecker's list (nos. 55–67, 78, 69–73, 83) together with Ramasseuses de varech (Yport). Émile Bernard continues (nos. 7-19bis, 75–88), illustrated by Reverie. Now, Louis Anquetin (Nos. 1-6bis) precedes Louis Roy (nos. 49-54bis) and an illustration of his Gardeur de cochons. Léon Fauché (nos. 22, 23, 25, 26, 28) and a reproduction of his Paysan occupies the next two pages, Charles Laval (nos. 84, 85, 89–96) and George Daniel (nos. 20-21bis) continue; Femme lisant of the latter is illustrated. The two final pages of the catalogue list two works by Ludovic Némo (nos. 74, 87) accompanied by an untitled reproduction, and note that an album of lithographs by Bernard and Gauguin can be seen on demand.

== Selected works from the catalogue ==
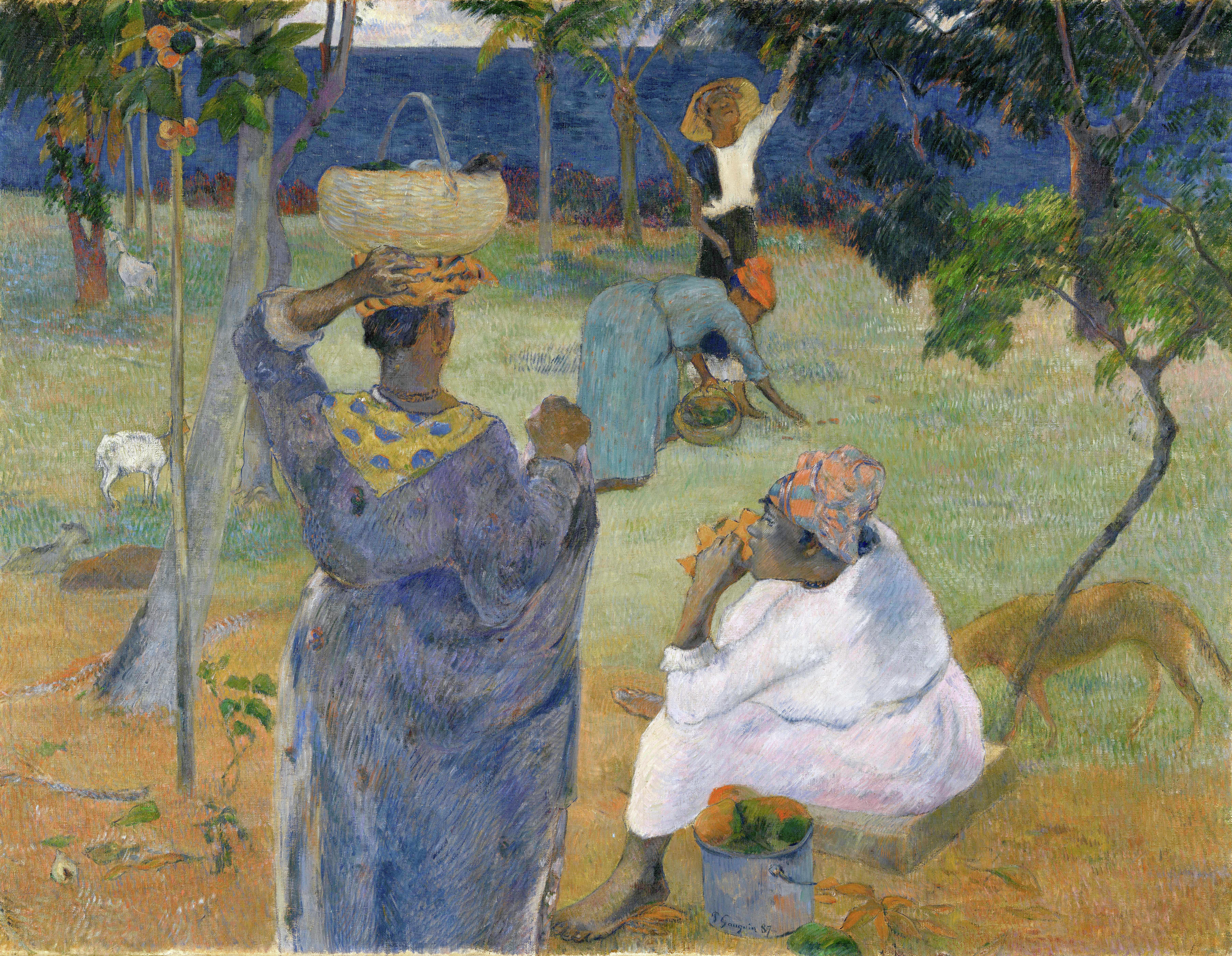
Paul Gauguin - The Mango Trees, Martinique. Purchased by Theo van Gogh for 400 francs, the most expensive painting he ever bought.

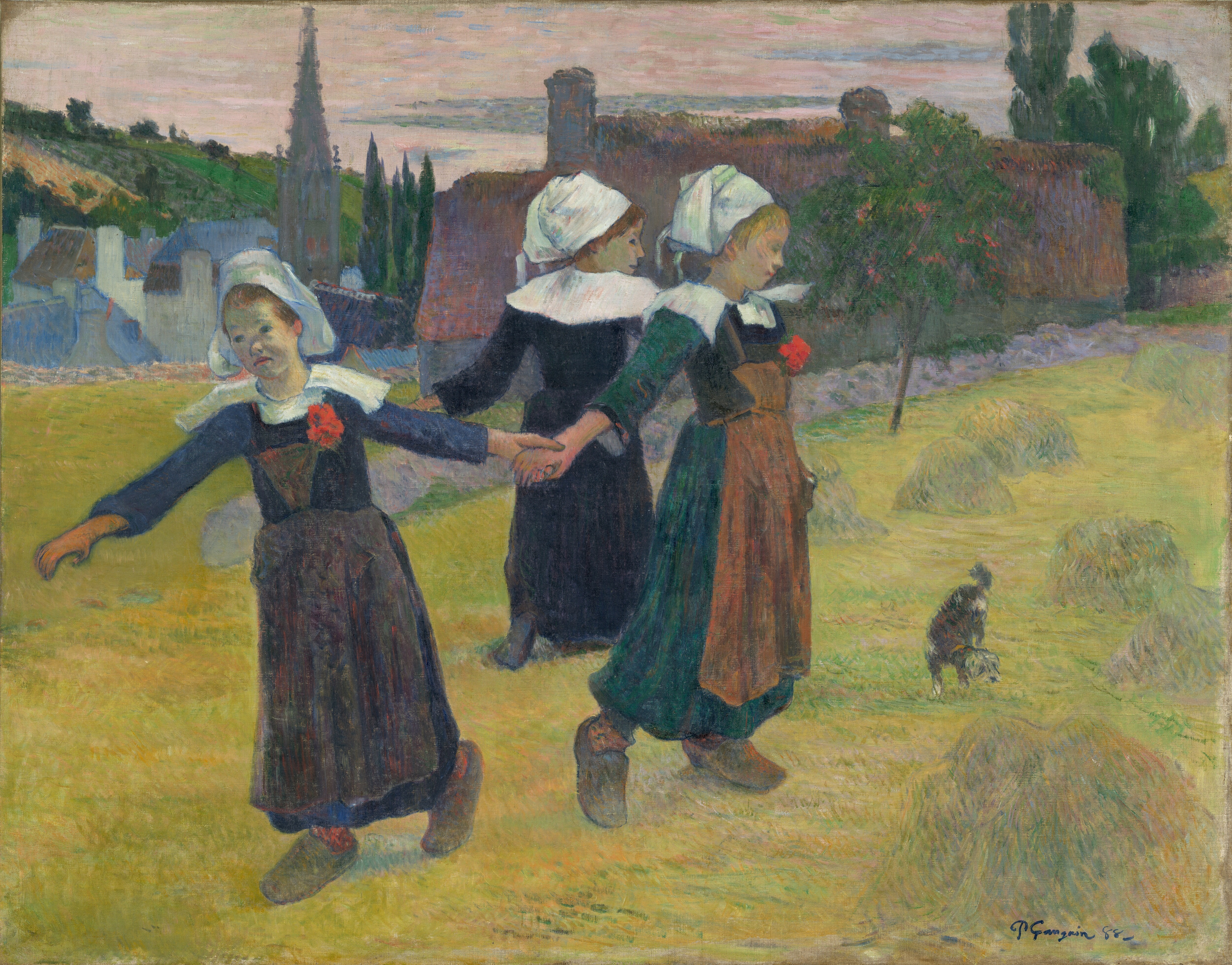
Paul Gauguin - Breton Girls Dancing.

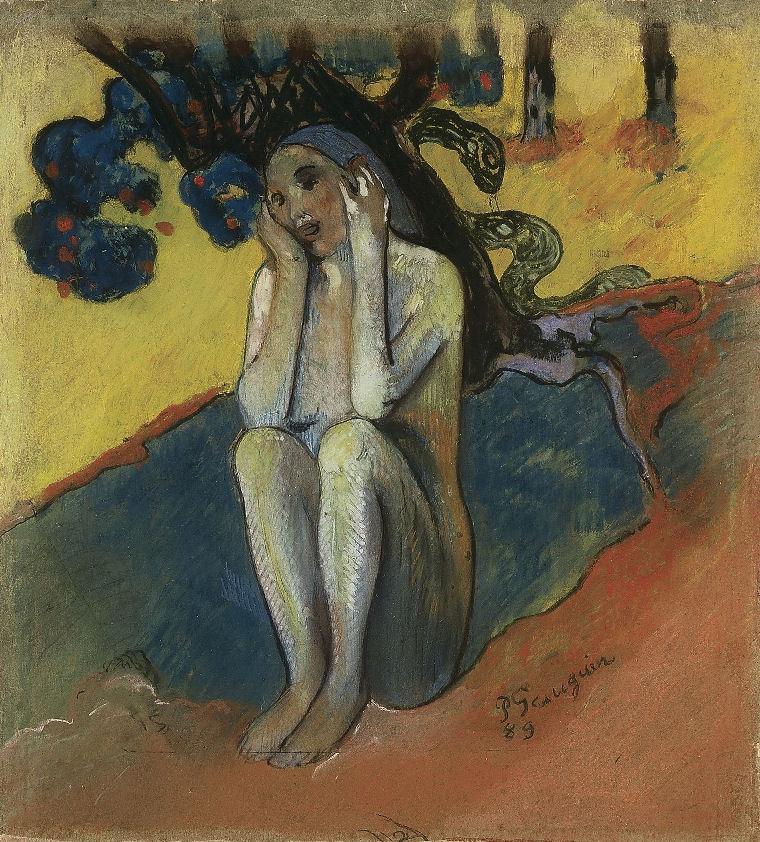
Paul Gauguin - Breton Eve

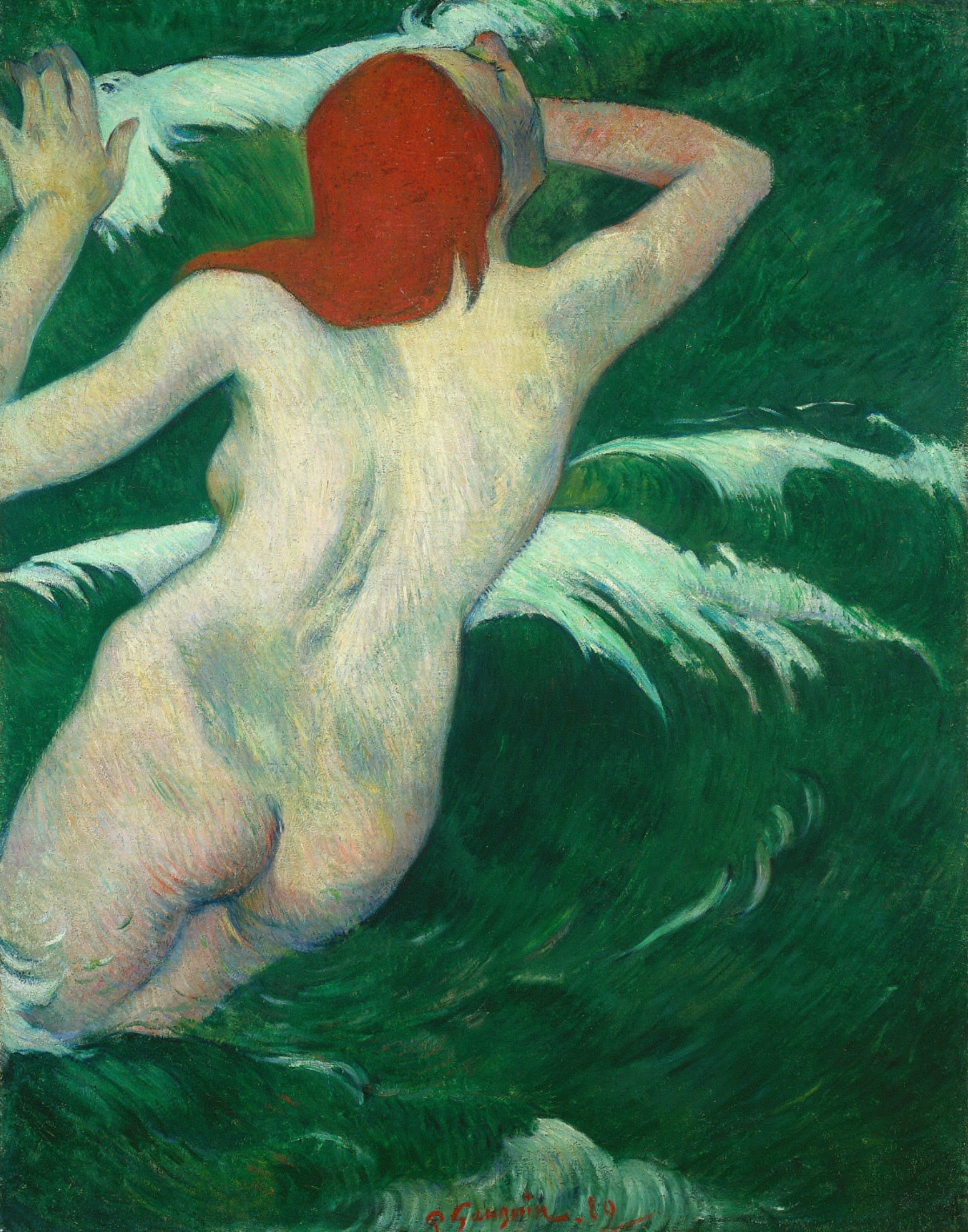
Paul Gauguin - In the Waves.

== Notes, references and sources ==
Notes and references

Sources

- Reff, Theodore, ed. (1982). Catalogue de L'Exposition de Peintures du Groupe Impressioniste et Synthétiste faite dans le local de M. Volpini au Champ-de-Mars 1889, Impr. Watelet; reprinted by Watelet-Arbelot, 1971, and republished in Modern Art in Paris, vol. 28, New York & London
- Frèches-Thory, Claire (1988). "Brittany, 1886–1890". The Art of Paul Gauguin. with Peter Zegers. National Gallery of Art. pp. 52–4. ISBN 0-8212-1723-2. LCCN 88-81005.
- Malingue, Maurice (1949). Paul Gauguin: letters to his wife and friends. Cleveland
- Mathews, Nancy Mowll (2001). Paul Gauguin, an Erotic Life. New Haven, Connecticut: Yale University Press, ISBN 0-300-09109-5
- Rewald, John (1978). Post-Impressionism: From Van Gogh to Gauguin, revised edition. London: Secker & Warburg, pp. 255–265
- Siberchicot, Clément (2011). L'Exposition Volpini, 1889. Paul Gauguin, Émile Bernard, Charles Laval: une avant-garde au coeur de l'Exposition universelle, Paris: Classiques Garnier
- Thomson, Belinda (1987). Gauguin. London: Thames and Hudson. ISBN 0-500-20220-6
