= Fresne-Saint-Mamès =

- Commune
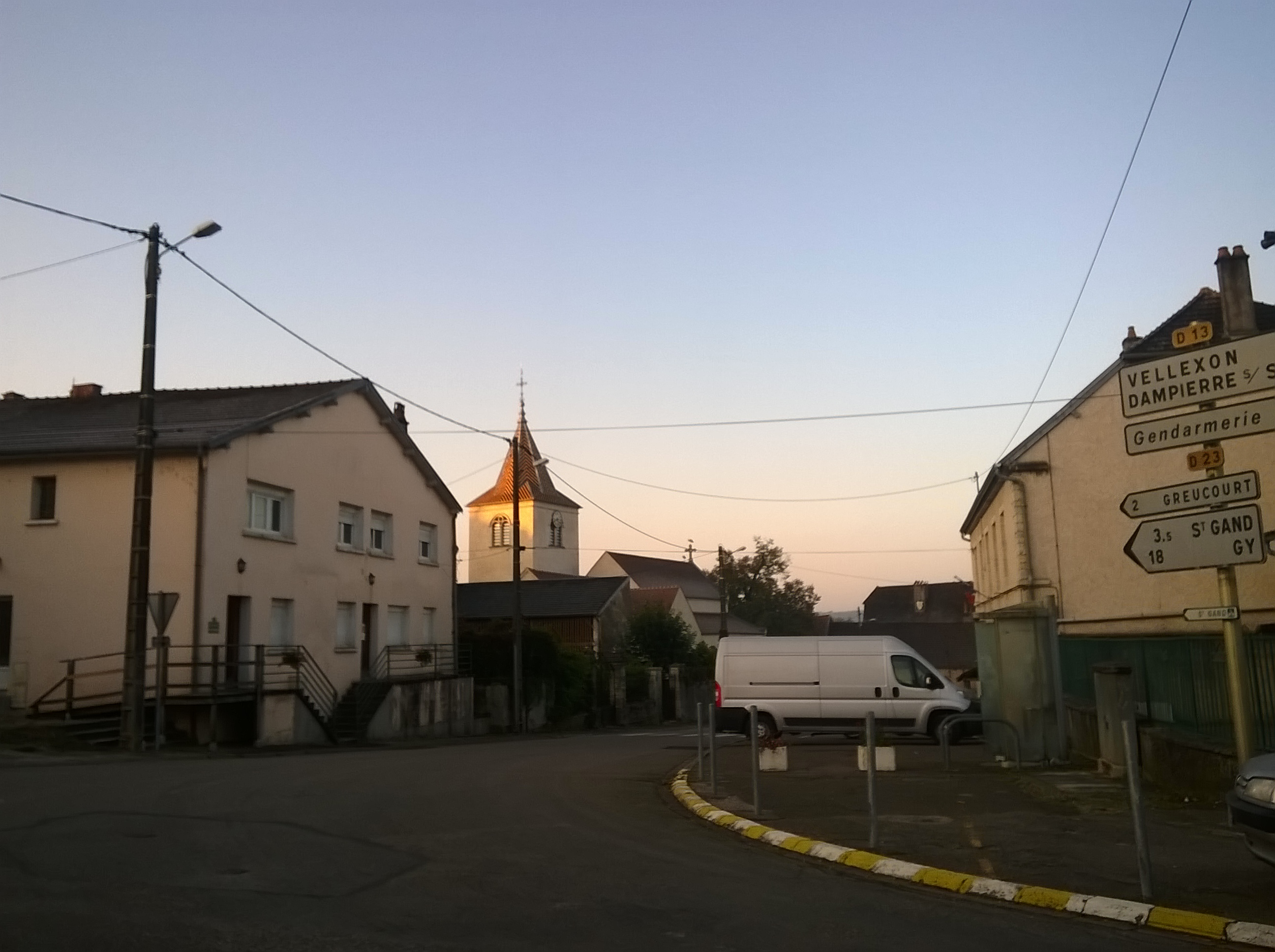
- The church and surroundings in Fresne-Saint-Mamès

- Coat of arms
- Location of Fresne-Saint-Mamès
- Location within France Location within Bourgogne-Franche-Comté
- Coordinates: 47°32′55″N 5°51′42″E
- Country: France
- Region: Bourgogne-Franche-Comté
- Department: Haute-Saône
- Arrondissement: Vesoul
- Canton: Scey-sur-Saône-et-Saint-Albin
- Area^{1}: 9.95 km^{2} (3.84 sq mi)
- Highest elevation: 262 m (860 ft)
- Lowest elevation: 200 m (660 ft)
- Population (2023): 491
  - Density: 49.3/km^{2} (128/sq mi)
- Time zone: UTC+01:00 (CET)
  - Summer (DST): UTC+02:00 (CEST)
- INSEE/Postal code: 70255 /70130
- ^{1} French Land Register data, which excludes lakes, ponds, glaciers > 1 km^{2} (0.386 sq mi or 247 acres) and river estuaries.

Fresne-Saint-Mamès is a commune in the Haute-Saône department in the region of Bourgogne-Franche-Comté in eastern France.

== See also ==
- Communes of the Haute-Saône department
