= Guewenheim =

Commune in Grand Est, France

- Commune
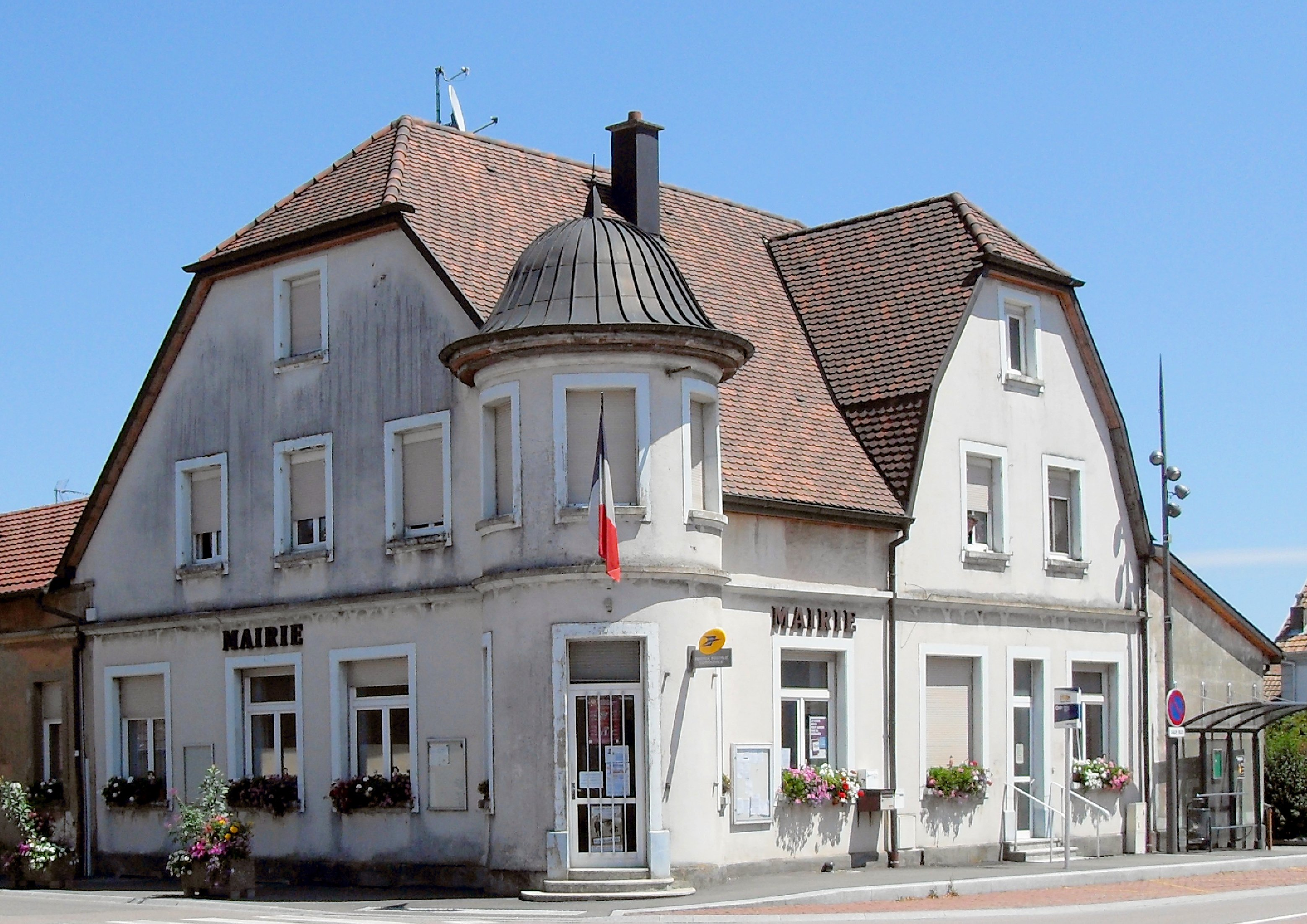
- The town hall in Guewenheim

- Coat of arms
- Location of Guewenheim
- Location within France Location within Grand Est
- Coordinates: 47°45′13″N 7°05′35″E
- Country: France
- Region: Grand Est
- Department: Haut-Rhin
- Arrondissement: Thann-Guebwiller
- Canton: Masevaux-Niederbruck
- Intercommunality: Vallée de la Doller et du Soultzbach

Government
  - Mayor (2020–2026): Jean-Luc Barberon
- Area^{1}: 8.55 km^{2} (3.30 sq mi)
- Elevation: 335 m (1,099 ft)
- Highest elevation: 420 m (1,380 ft)
- Lowest elevation: 309 m (1,014 ft)
- Population (2023): 1,368
  - Density: 160/km^{2} (414/sq mi)
- Time zone: UTC+01:00 (CET)
  - Summer (DST): UTC+02:00 (CEST)
- INSEE/Postal code: 68115 /68116
- ^{1} French Land Register data, which excludes lakes, ponds, glaciers > 1 km^{2} (0.386 sq mi or 247 acres) and river estuaries.

Guewenheim (French pronunciation: [ɡevənaim]; German: Gewenheim; Alsatian: Gaiwana) is a commune in the Haut-Rhin department in Grand Est in north-eastern France.

== See also ==
- Communes of the Haut-Rhin département
