= Léon Fauché =

French painter

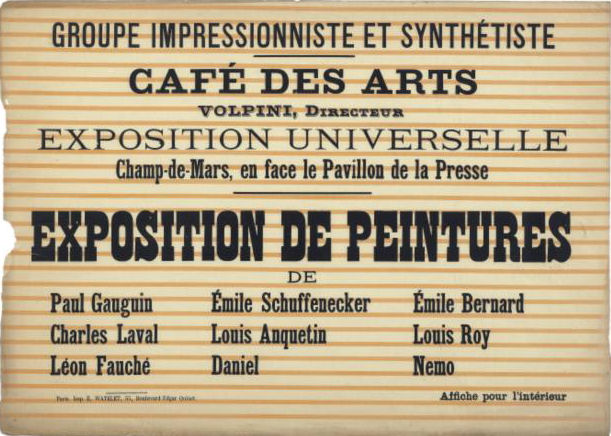
Poster of the 1889 Exhibition of Paintings by the Impressionist and Synthetist Group, at Café des Arts, Volpini manager.

Léon Fauché (born Briey (Meurthe-et-Moselle); 1868–1950) was a French painter who in 1901, with Anquetin, organised the Salon des Refusés at the Pavillon des Arts Décoratifs, and founded the Association The Studio (L'Atelier) with Armand Point.

Fauché studied at the École des Beaux-Arts in Nancy and then with Aimé Morot and Chartran in Paris. He exhibited at the Salon des Indépendants with Toulouse-Lautrec, Dethomas and Anquetin. He also showed his work at the Salon of the Société Nationale des Beaux-Arts and The Volpini Exhibition, 1889.
