= 1889 in art =

The year 1889 in art involved some significant events.

== Events ==
- February 2 – Sixth annual exhibition of Les XX opens in Brussels, including the first important display of Paul Gauguin's work (including Vision After the Sermon) and Seurat's 1888 seascapes of Port-en-Bessin.
- May 6–October 31 – Exposition Universelle in Paris, with the Eiffel Tower as its entrance arch.
- May 8 – Van Gogh moves from Arles to the Saint-Paul asylum in Saint-Rémy-de-Provence.
- June – The Volpini Exhibition: Exposition de peintures du Groupe impressioniste et synthétiste, faite dans le local de M. Volpini au Champ-de-Mars organised by Paul Gauguin and Émile Schuffenecker at the Café des Arts in Paris; other exhibitors include Émile Bernard and Charles Laval.
- July 15 – The Scottish National Portrait Gallery opens in Edinburgh in premises designed by Rowand Anderson, the first in the world to be purpose-built as a portrait gallery.
- July 23 – Marie Triepcke marries fellow-artist Peder Severin Krøyer in Augsburg.
- August 17 – The 9 by 5 Impression Exhibition opens in Melbourne, Australia.
- Edvard Munch stages his first one-man exhibition and wins a state scholarship to study in Paris.
- Alfred Sisley settles at Moret-sur-Loing.
- The Skulpturensammlung moves into the Albertinum in Dresden.
- The Imperial Museum of Nara is established in Japan.

== Works ==
The Starry Night by Vincent van Gogh

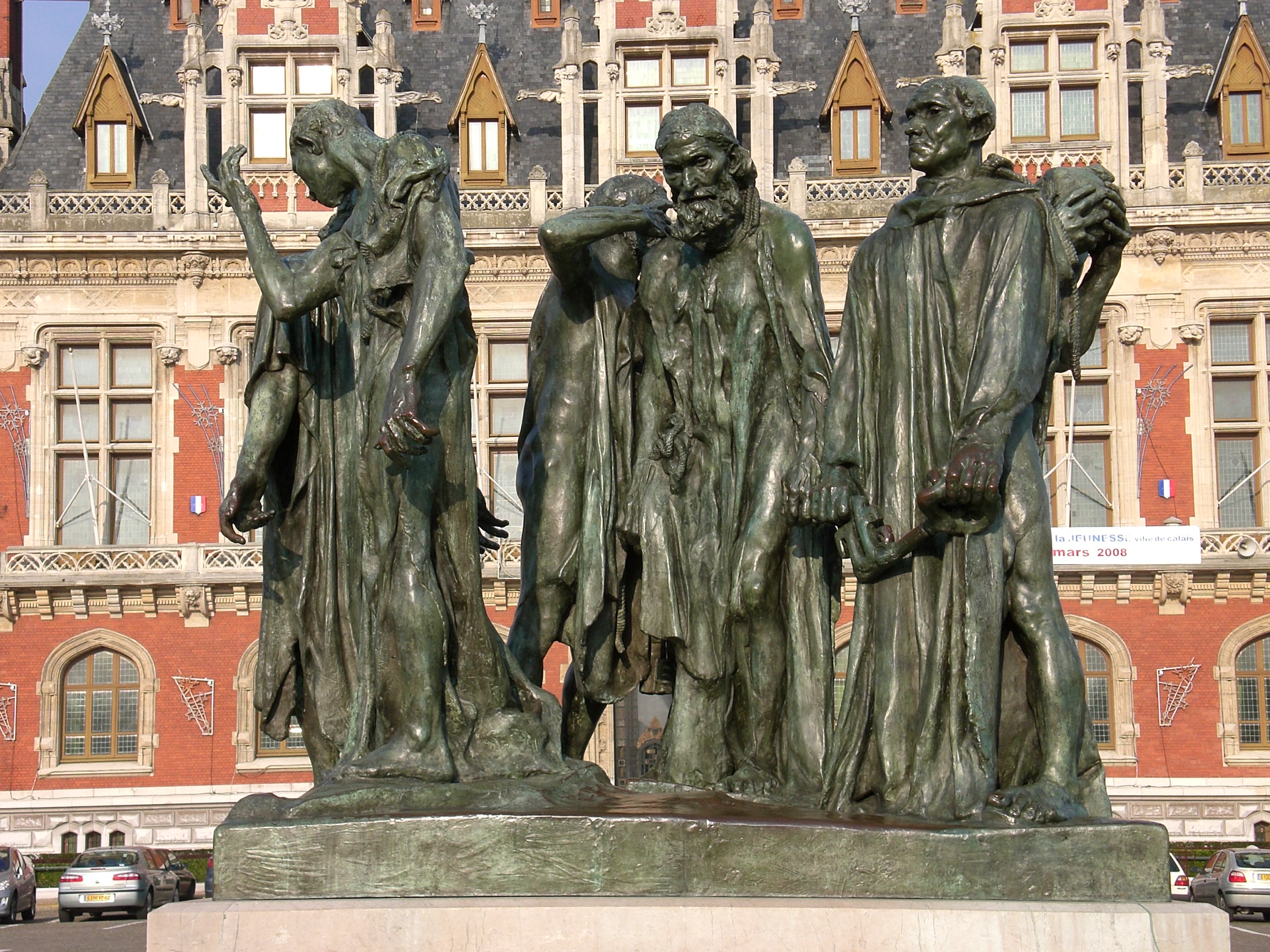
The Burghers of Calais by Auguste Rodin

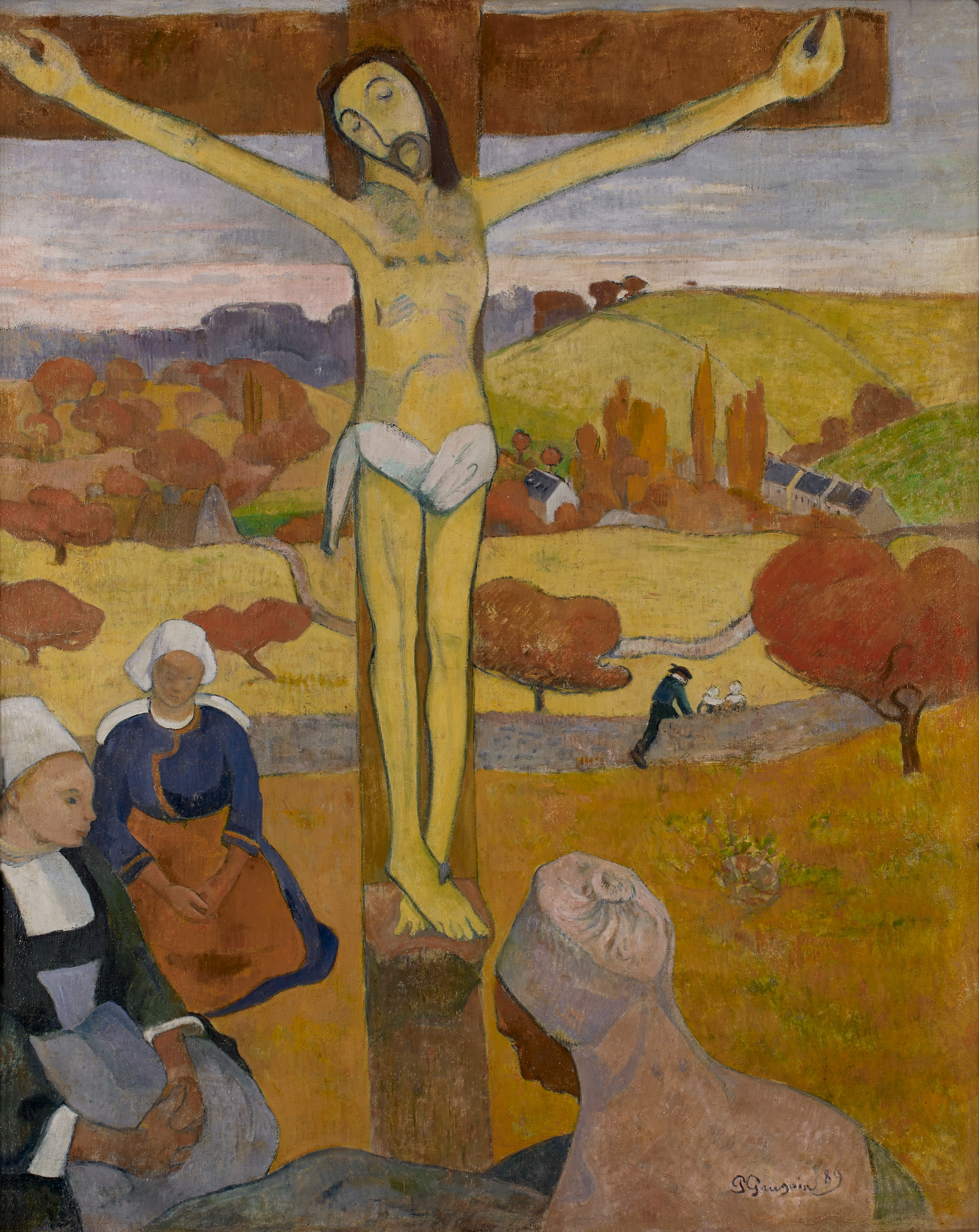
The Yellow Christ by Paul Gauguin

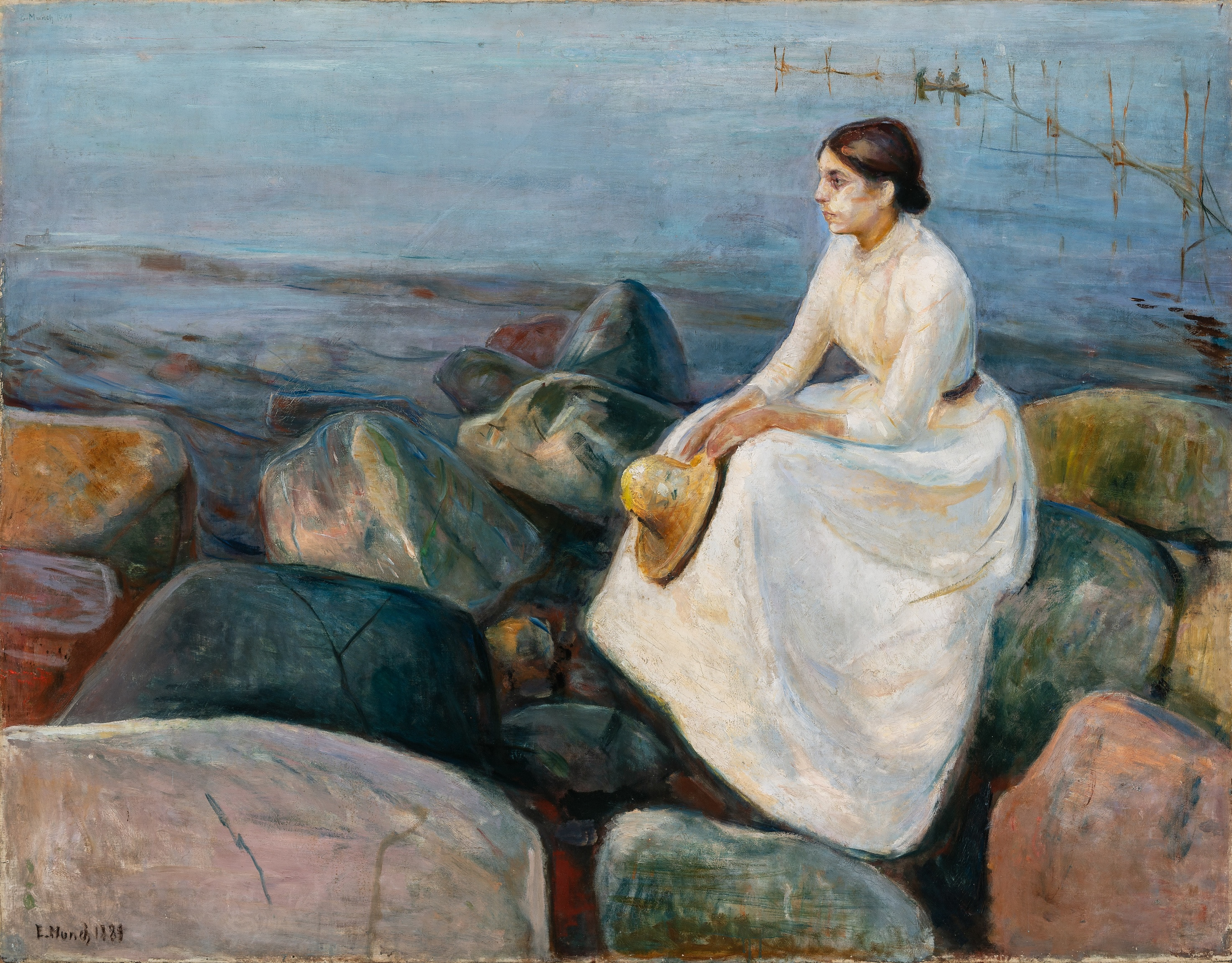
Inger on the Beach by Edvard Munch

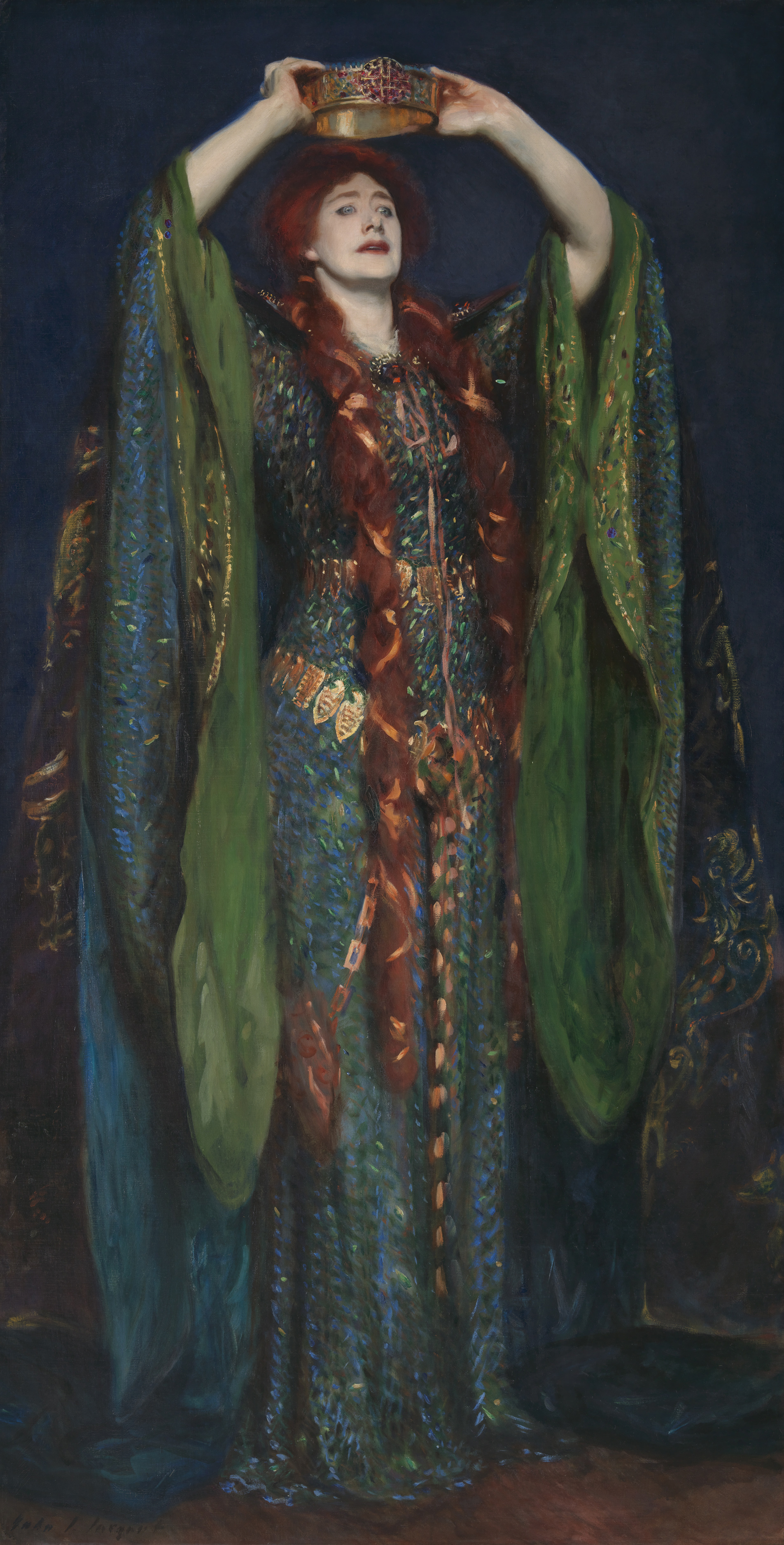
Ellen Terry as Lady Macbeth by John Singer Sargent

- Jean Béraud - La Pâtisserie Gloppe
- Pierre Bonnard – Self-portrait (approx. date)
- William-Adolphe Bouguereau
  - Première rêverie
  - The Shepherdess
- Antoine Bourdelle – Adam
- Henry Jamyn Brooks – Private View of the Old Masters Exhibition, Royal Academy, 1888
- Milly Childers – Self-portrait
- George Clausen – The Girl at the Gate
- Henry de Groux – Christ aux Outrages
- Thomas Eakins – The Agnew Clinic
- Paul Gustav Fischer – The Royal Theatre Ballet School, Copenhagen
- Stanhope Forbes – The Health of the Bride
- Henry Justice Ford – Illustrations to Andrew Lang's The Blue Fairy Book
- Louis Édouard Fournier – The Funeral of Shelley
- William Powell Frith – The New Frock
- Paul Gauguin
  - The Green Christ and The Yellow Christ (Pont-Aven, c. September)
  - Portrait of Jacob Meijer de Haan (Le Pouldu, after October 2)
  - Self-Portrait with Halo and Snake (Le Pouldu, after October 2)
  - The Flageolet Player on the Cliff (Le Pouldu)
- Alfred Gilbert – Marble bust of Queen Victoria
- J. W. Godward
  - Grecian Reverie
  - His Birthday Gift
  - Ianthe
  - Waiting For An Answer
- Peter Graham – After the Massacre of Glencoe
- Félix Resurrección Hidalgo – La Parisienne
- John Callcott Horsley – Portrait of Martin Colnaghi
- Jozef Israëls – A Son of the Ancient Race (several versions)
- Juan Luna – Hymen o Hymenee
- Frederick McCubbin – Down on His Luck
- Arturo Michelena – La Joven Madre ("The Young Mother")
- Claude Monet – The Valley of the Creuse, Sunset
- Edvard Munch
  - Inger on the Beach
  - Music on Karl Johan Street
  - Spring
- Blanche Nevin – Peter Muhlenberg (marble)
- Eilif Peterssen – Salmon Fishermen at Nesøya
- Ilya Repin – Portrait of Baroness Varvara Ivanovna Ikskul von Hildenbandt
- Auguste Rodin – The Burghers of Calais (sculpture)
- John Singer Sargent
  - Gabriel Fauré
  - Ellen Terry as Lady Macbeth
  - Lady Fishing - Mrs Ormond
  - An Out-of-Doors Study
- Henryk Siemiradzki – Phryne at the Poseidonia in Eleusis
- Arthur Streeton – Golden Summer, Eaglemont
- Franz Stuck – The Guardian of Paradise
- Vincent van Gogh
  - Hospital in Arles series
    - Garden of the Hospital in Arles (June)
    - Ward in the Hospital in Arles (October)
    - Portrait of Doctor Félix Rey (January)
  - Self-portrait and Self-Portrait with Bandaged Ear (January)
  - Self-Portrait as a sick person (Saint-Rémy, August)
  - Bedroom in Arles (second and third versions, September)
  - View of Arles, Flowering Orchards and View of Arles with Trees in Blossom (Spring)
  - Butterflies series (Spring)
  - Irises
  - Rain (Saint-Rémy, October/November)
  - The Ravine of the Peyroulets
  - A Road at Saint-Remy with Female Figure
  - The Starry Night (Saint-Rémy, June)
  - Saint-Paul Asylum, Saint-Rémy series
    - Trees and Undergrowth series
  - Portrait of Trabuc, an Attendant at Saint-Paul Hospital and Portrait of Madame Trabuc (Saint-Rémy, September)
  - Two Crabs (c. January)
  - Wheat Fields series
    - Wheat Field, Sunrise (Saint-Rémy)
    - Wheat Field with Cypresses (three paintings, Saint-Rémy, July–September)
    - Peasant Woman Binding Sheaves (after Millet)
- Carl von Marr – The Flagellants
- Fritz von Uhde – Heathland princess
- Édouard Vuillard – Self-portrait
- John Quincy Adams Ward – Bust of Alexander Lyman Holley (bronze, New York City)

== Births ==
- January 19 – Sophie Taeuber-Arp, Swiss geometric abstract painter, sculptor and dancer (died 1943)
- January 21 – Hermann Glöckner, German Constructivist painter and sculptor (died 1987)
- April 15 – Thomas Hart Benton, American painter and muralist (died 1975)
- May 11 – Paul Nash, English painter (died 1946)
- June 13 – Gao Qifeng, Chinese painter (died 1933)
- July 31 – Júlíana Sveinsdóttir, Icelandic painter and textile artist (died 1966)
- August 13 – C. R. W. Nevinson, English war artist (died 1946)
- August 20 – David Kakabadze, Georgian artist (died 1952)
- September 28 – Seán Keating, Irish romantic-realist painter (died 1977)
- October 10 – Han van Meegeren, Dutch painter and art forger (died 1947)
- October 17 – Karl Völker, German painter and architect (died 1962)
- October 29 – Edward Wadsworth, English painter (died 1949)
- November 1 – Hannah Höch, German Dada photomontage artist (died 1978)
- November 10 – Clive Stephen, Australian sculptor (died 1957)

== Deaths ==
- January 23 – Alexandre Cabanel, painter (born 1823)
- February 5 – James Smetham, pre-Raphaelite painter (born 1821)
- February 24 – Philip Henry Delamotte, photographer and illustrator (born 1821)
- May 23 – John O'Connor, painter (born 1830)
- October 6 – Jules Dupré, painter (born 1811)
- December 27 – Eduard Bendemann, painter (born 1811)
- date unknown – Jules Tavernier, French painter (born 1844)
