= Self-Portrait with the Yellow Christ =

Painting by Paul Gauguin

- Portrait de l'artiste au Christ jaune (French)
- Artist: Paul Gauguin
- Year: 1890 or 1891
- Medium: Oil on canvas
- Dimensions: 38 cm × 46 cm (15 in × 18 in)
- Location: Musée d'Orsay, Paris

Self-Portrait with the Yellow Christ also known as Portrait of the Artist with the Yellow Christ is an 1890 or 1891 painting by Paul Gauguin, produced in Pont-Aven in Brittany and now in the musée d'Orsay in Paris, to which it was assigned after its purchase by the French state in 1994 with financial assistance from Philippe Meyer and a Japanese patron.

The artist shows himself between two of his own artworks, The Yellow Christ (1889) and a grotesque ceramic self-portrait – he often used Christ as a symbol for himself and thus the work fulfilled his desire to create a triple self-portrait.

== History ==
When the artist began the canvas he had been in Pont-Aven for two years. He produced the work just before leaving for Tahiti. The work is one of several on religious themes from the same period, making him (in Manuel Jover's words) the "original core of Symbolism in painting" – it also included The Yellow Christ and The Green Christ. Initially in the collection of Gauguin's friend Daniel de Monfreid (1856–1929), it had entered Ambroise Vollard's gallery by 1902. It was acquired by Maurice Denis in 1903.

== Legacy ==
In 2004, Peruvian painter Herman Braun-Vega created Notre ancêtre le Gaulois (Gauguin) (Our Ancestor the Gaul (Gauguin)), an appropriation of the Self-Portrait with the Yellow Christ that addresses the cultural shock tied to the colonial context in which Gauguin lived.

== See also ==
- List of paintings by Paul Gauguin
