= Statue of Peter Muhlenberg =

Statue in the U.S. Capitol

Peter Muhlenberg
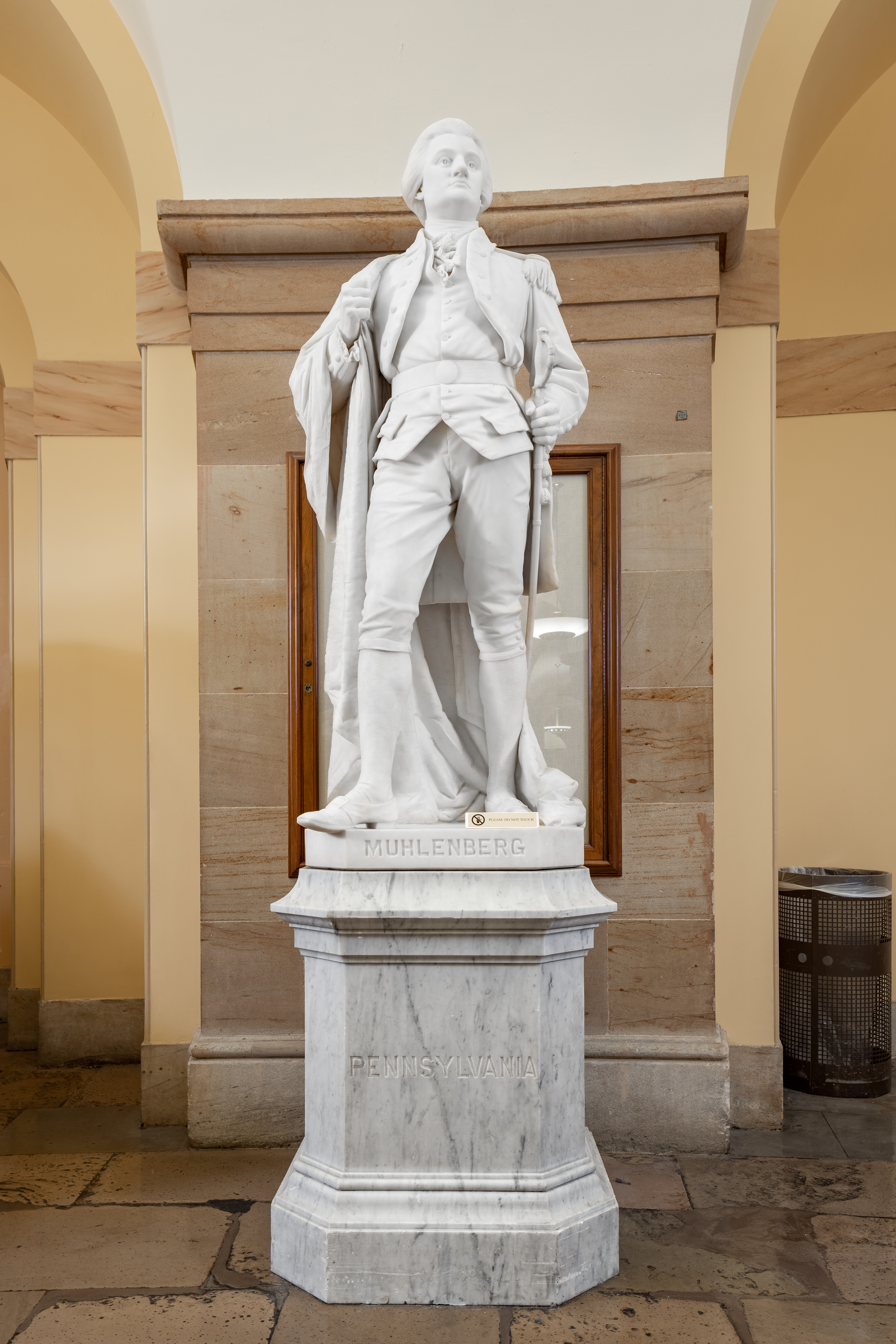
- The statue at the U.S. Capitol crypt in 2022
- Artist: Blanche Nevin
- Year: 1889
- Medium: Marble sculpture
- Subject: Peter Muhlenberg
- Location: Washington, D.C., United States

Peter Muhlenberg, or John Peter Gabriel Muhlenberg, is an 1889 marble sculpture depicting the American clergyman, soldier, and politician of the same name by Blanche Nevin, installed in the United States Capitol's crypt, in Washington, D.C., as part of the National Statuary Hall Collection. It is one of two statues donated by the state of Pennsylvania. The statue was accepted into the collection on February 28, 1889, by Pennsylvania Congressman Daniel Ermentrout.

Nevin produced the statue in Carrara, Italy, likely utilizing the skilled marble carvers there. Rubenstein in her work American Women Sculptors calls the statue a “rather effeminate figure in colonial garb,” while Taft in his History of American Sculpture is less kind, calling the statue “insignificant”.

== See also ==
- 1889 in art
