= The Flageolet Player on the Cliff =

Painting by Paul Gauguin

- Le joueur de flageolet sur la falaise (French)
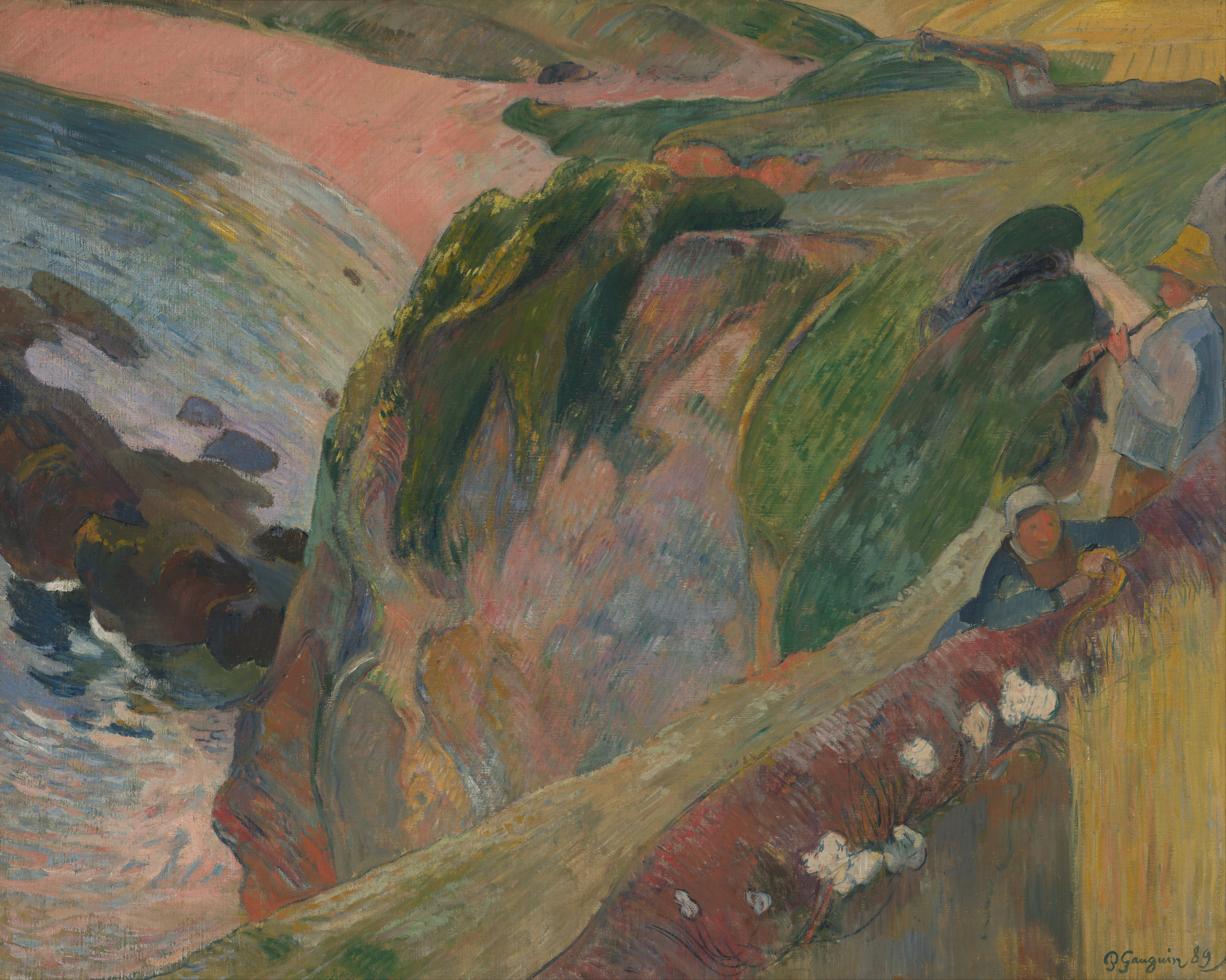
- Artist: Paul Gauguin
- Year: 1889
- Type: Oil painting on canvas
- Dimensions: 70.96 cm × 91.28 cm (27.938 in × 35.938 in)
- Location: Indianapolis Museum of Art, Indianapolis

The Flageolet Player on the Cliff is an 1889 oil painting by French artist Paul Gauguin, located in the Indianapolis Museum of Art, which is in Indianapolis, Indiana. It depicts a Breton couple on a narrow path precipitously overlooking the Atlantic.

== Description ==
The Flageolet Player on the Cliff is a panoramic view of a rugged patch of shoreline in Brittany, viewed from a dizzying overhead perspective. The unusual point of view and brilliant patchwork of colors make the painting somewhat challenging visually, but it is not an inaccurate representation of the scene. Period photographs show similar wave patterns, and Gauguin wrote that the sand was rose, rather than yellow. On a narrow path stand a boy and girl; she holds a scythe for cutting the wheat represented by the patch of yellow in the lower right corner, while he plays a flageolet, a local flute. These attributes, scythe and flute, represent Gauguin's enduring attachment to "the harmonies of Breton life." The lower right corner is signed "P. Gauguin 89."

== Historical information ==
In 1889, Gauguin traveled to Le Pouldu, a remote coastal village in Brittany. Its dramatic scenery evoked a strong response in him. Applying the Pont-Aven School approach called Synthetism, he merged the actual appearance of the scene, his emotional reaction to it, and his artistic sense of design.

=== Acquisition ===
The Flageolet Player on the Cliff was acquired in 1998 as part of a collection of Gauguin and his Pont-Aven coterie. Samuel Josefowitz, a Swiss collector, amassed the 17 paintings and 84 prints, worth an estimated $30 million. $20 million of that came courtesy of a challenge grant from the Lilly Endowment. The remainder was raised by the IMA, with an undisclosed amount being given by Josefowitz himself, a museum trustee. He acquired the Pont-Aven collection in the 1950s and '60s, before that period's importance in Gauguin's development was fully appreciated. This particular painting hangs in the Jane H. Fortune Gallery and has the acquisition number 1998.168.

== See also ==
- The Green Christ
- List of paintings by Paul Gauguin
