= Inger on the Beach =

1889 painting by Norwegian expressionist Edvard Munch

- Inger på stranden, Sommernatt (Norwegian)
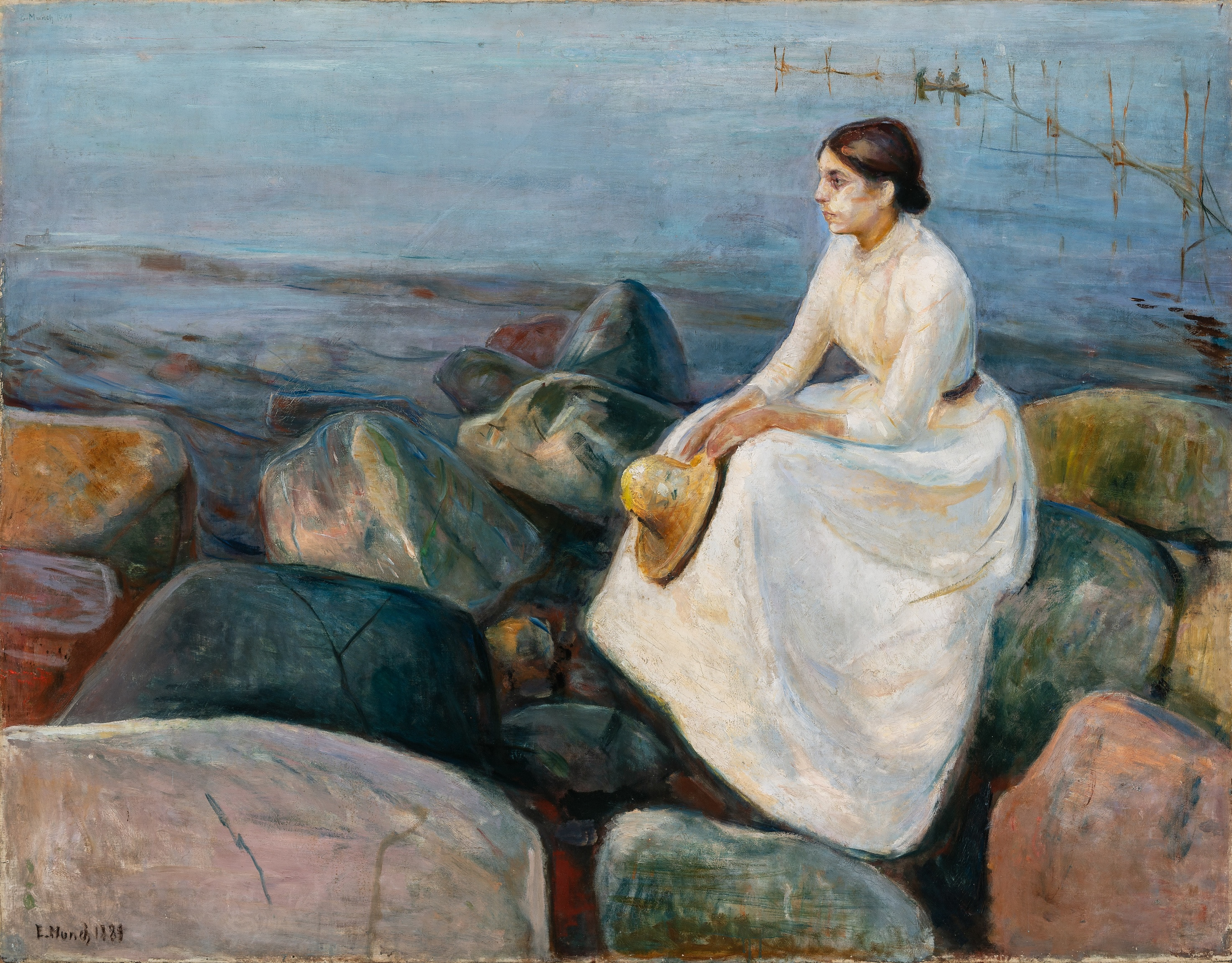
- Artist: Edvard Munch
- Year: 1889
- Medium: Oil on canvas
- Dimensions: 123.6 cm × 158.9 cm (48.7 in × 62.6 in)
- Location: Bergen Kunstmuseum, Bergen

Inger on the Beach (also Summer Night; Norwegian: Inger på stranden, Sommernatt) is a painting by the Norwegian artist Edvard Munch. It was created in the summer of 1889, at Åsgårdstrand and is a portrait of Munch's youngest sister Inger.

== Description ==
A young woman, identified by the title as Munch's youngest sister Inger, sits in a quiet pose, a straw hat in her hands, on a large granite rock and holds her head in profile. Her bright white dress contrasts with the green mossy stones and the blues and purples of the sea water behind her, which, as the alternative titles indicate, suggests Nordic summer nights. Only a few pots and a fishing boat behind her betray human life in the countryside. Munch used a similar pose for his 1884 interior composition Morning, featuring a girl on the edge of a bed.

== History ==
In the summer of 1889, Munch rented a small house in Åsgårdstrand, a small Norwegian coastal town on the Oslofjord, which served as a summer resort of many citizens and artists from nearby Kristiana, now Oslo. Among them were Munch's friends Christian Krohg and Frits Thaulow. The place acquired great importance in the life of Munch: Here he spent not only many summers, and bought in 1897 a house, it was the place for many important pictures of his life work. In 1889, his first year in Åsgårdstrand, he painted Inger on the beach. The model was his youngest sister Inger, who had previously modeled for him. The painting was preceded by a series of studies Munch made between 9 and 11 pm to study the lighting conditions of Norwegian summer night.

== Interpretation ==
Ulrich Bischoff suggests that—unlike Munch's earlier 1884 portrait of the then 14-year-old Inger in her black confirmation dress, a youthful work in the tradition of portraiture of the 19th century—Inger on the beach shows the future importance of the artist. Munch displays in this work his artistic repertoire for expressing loneliness, melancholy and angst, and foreshadows the compositional breakdown in horizontal and vertical axes of the later Frieze of Life.

For Reinhold Heller the painting conveys less a time of day than a mood, created by the contours and dimensional representations of figure and stones, the nonexistent horizon between sky and sea, and the almost monochrome blue. Anni Carlsson describes the work as a "character landscape" in which the beach, sea and figure are incorporated into a mood and the boundaries cancel space.

In a later statement, Munch compared seaside rocks with living creatures, goblins and sea spirits: "In the night's light which forms have fantastic tones". Nicolay Stang compares the "simplification of form and color, which is a colored form against the other" to Paul Gauguin, a painter whose work was familiar to Munch before 1889.

Tone Skedsmo says Inger on the beach is in the tradition of the naturalistic painters of the "Fleksum colony", namely Christian Skredsvig, Eilif Peterssen, Erik Werenskiold, Gerhard Munthe, Kitty Kielland and Harriet Backer, who were known for their quiet summer night moods. While the composition of a figure in a landscape and the elegiac mood are typical of the work of Munch's Norwegian colleagues, Munch's simplification of forms to express a mood adds elements of modernity. He may have been influenced by Puvis de Chavannes and Jules Bastien-Lepage, whom he had met at the Exposition Universelle d'Anvers (1885), in the rigid countenance of Ingers with her blank stare and the dry handling of the paint.

== Reception ==
A few months after its completion, the painting (originally titled Evening) was displayed for the first time at the annual autumn exhibition in Kristiana, while Munch had already traveled to Paris to collect impressions of the local art scene through which his symbolism would find expressive style. The contemporary criticism was extremely hostile. Morgenbladet called the painting pure "gibberish" and said the public was being bamboozled. Other voices criticized the "easily thrown stones that seem to be made only from soft, shapeless substance". Aftenposten described the seated figure as "a physical entity with no trace of life and expression, as untrue in the form as in the color [...] On the whole this seems to us to have such a low artistic value that his presence at the exhibition itself is difficult to defend. " Dagbladet nevertheless pointed out: "To understand it, one must constantly have in mind that Munch poet is - a person who can be entirely covered by a mood to her and her playing devotedly, without regard to conventional laws and forms, often with a tendency to fantasy. "

Munch's Norwegian colleague Erik Werenskiold bought it directly from the exhibition in 1909; it was acquired in 1924 by the Norwegian art collector Rasmus Meyer as part of his public collections in Bergen.

== See also ==
- List of paintings by Edvard Munch
