= Blanche Nevin =

American writer

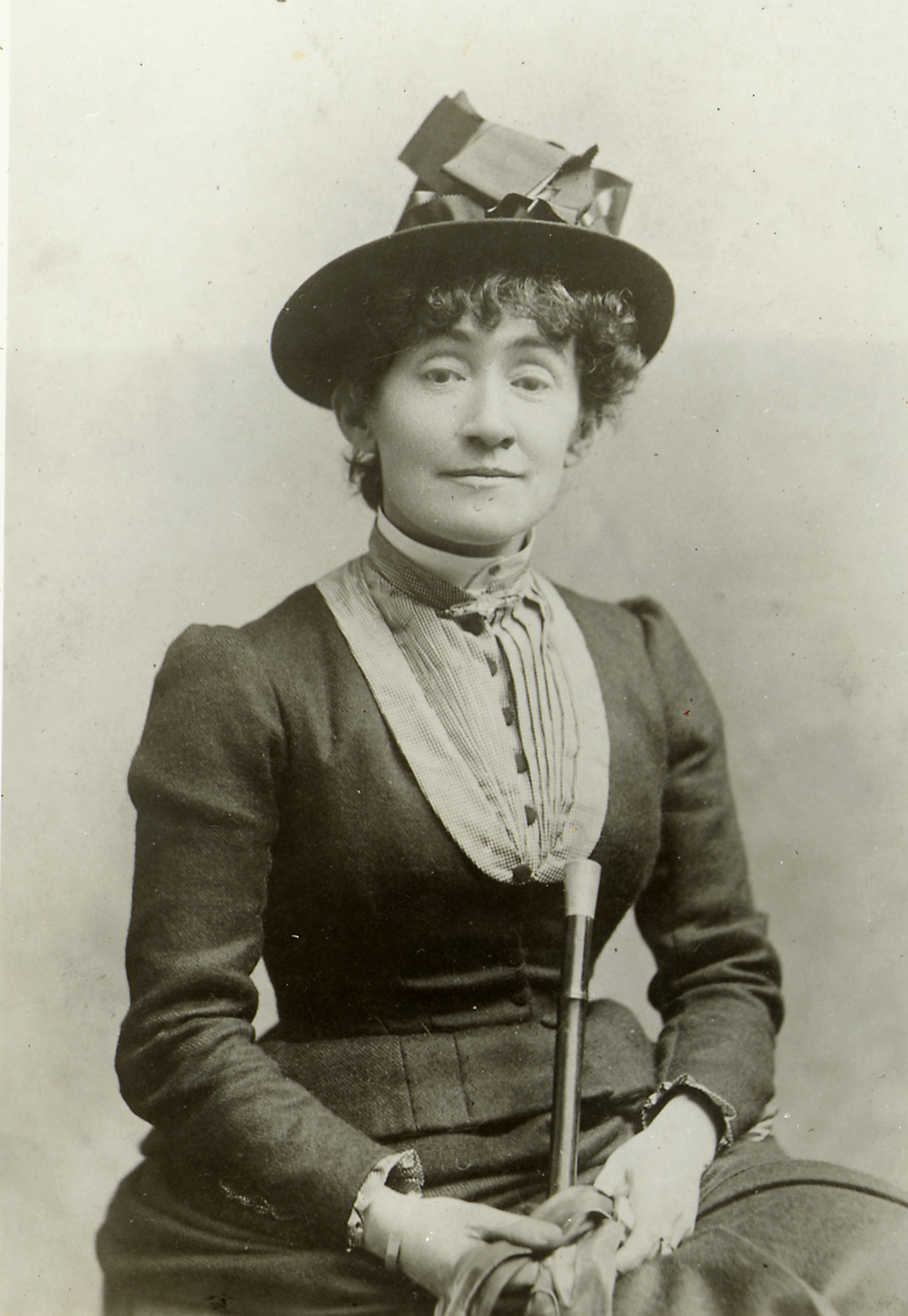
- Blanche Nevin
- Born: 1841; Mercersburg, Pennsylvania, U.S.
- Died: 1925 (aged 83–84)
- Education: Pennsylvania Academy of the Fine Arts; Royal Art Academy in Venice
- Known for: Sculpture

Blanche Nevin (1841–1925) was an American artist and poet. She is responsible for the sculpture of Revolutionary War General Peter Muhlenberg in the U.S. Capitol's National Statuary Hall Collection, and was described by Lanchester History website as " the nation’s first noteworthy sculptress".

== Early life and education ==
She was born at Mercersburg, Franklin County, Pennsylvania, the daughter of Dr. John Williamson Nevin (1803–1886), a theologian, teacher, and minister, and Martha Jenkins. She moved with her family to Lancaster, Pennsylvania in 1855, when her father became the president of Franklin & Marshall College. She studied art at the Pennsylvania Academy of the Fine Arts with Joseph Alxis Bailly, at the Royal Art Academy in Venice, Italy, and at Carrara, Italy. She also traveled to China and Japan. She usually spent half her year at her home Windsor Forge Mansion and the other half abroad.

== Career and mid-life ==
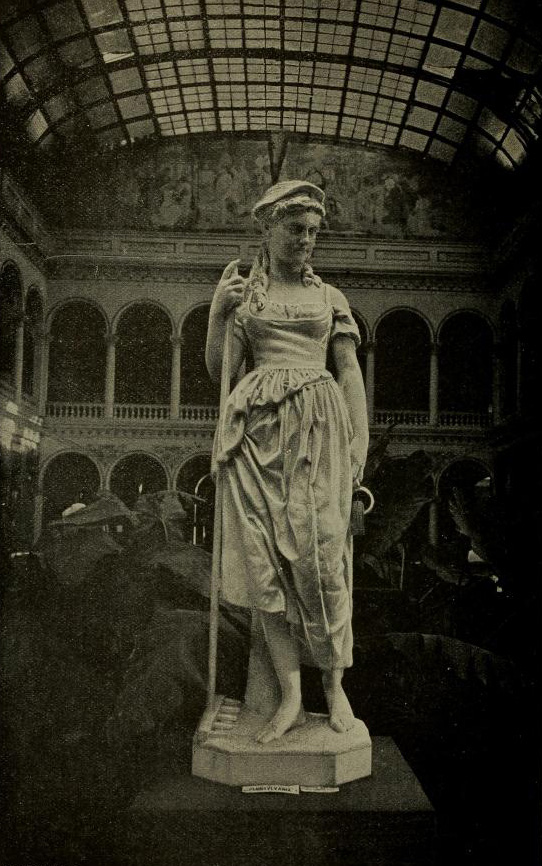
Maud Muller, in the Woman's Building, 1893

She exhibited a marble statue of Maud Muller at the 1876 Centennial Exposition in Philadelphia. She exhibited it again at the 1893 World's Columbian Exposition, where it was placed in the Woman's Building's Rotunda. The statue is now owned by the Iris Club in Lancaster.

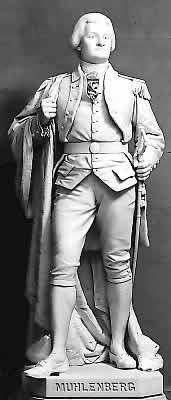
Peter Muhlenberg, in the National Statuary Hall Collection

In 1889, she sculpted the statue of Peter Muhlenberg on commission from the Commonwealth of Pennsylvania. It is located in the United States Capitol crypt. She also sculpted the bust of President Woodrow Wilson. She also sculpted "Lion in the Park" (1905) at Reservoir Park and the horse drinking fountain (1898) at the intersection of Columbia Avenue and West Orange Street in Lancaster. Her poems include: "Great-Grandma’s Looking-Glass" (1895), "One Usual Day" (1916), and "To My Door" (1921), and some of her poems are located at the Lancaster Historical Society, Pennsylvania.

In 1899, she bought Windsor Forge Mansion in Caernarvon Township, Pennsylvania. The house once belonged to her grandfather Robert Jenkins (1769–1848), who was a congressman and ironmaster. She restored the mansion house and added a studio. In 1913, she deeded the property to her nephew John Nevin Sayre. The grounds have three sculptures executed by Nevin, and they are contributing objects to the national historic district.

== Legacy ==
Her life and works are captured in The Lion In The Park by Phyllis J.S. Brubaker.

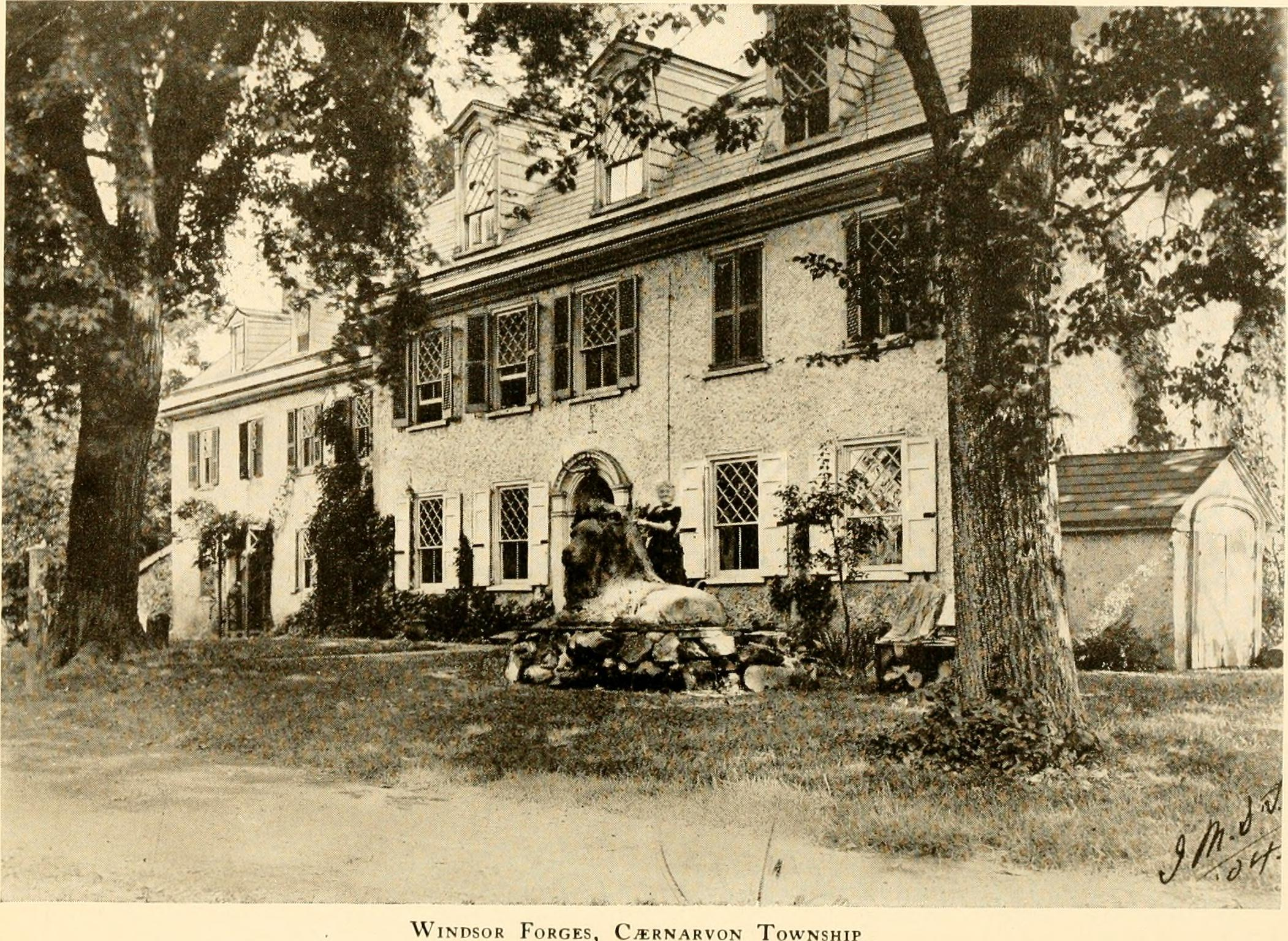
Blanche Nevin at Windsor Forge, ca. 1920
