= The Yellow Christ =

1889 painting by Paul Gauguin

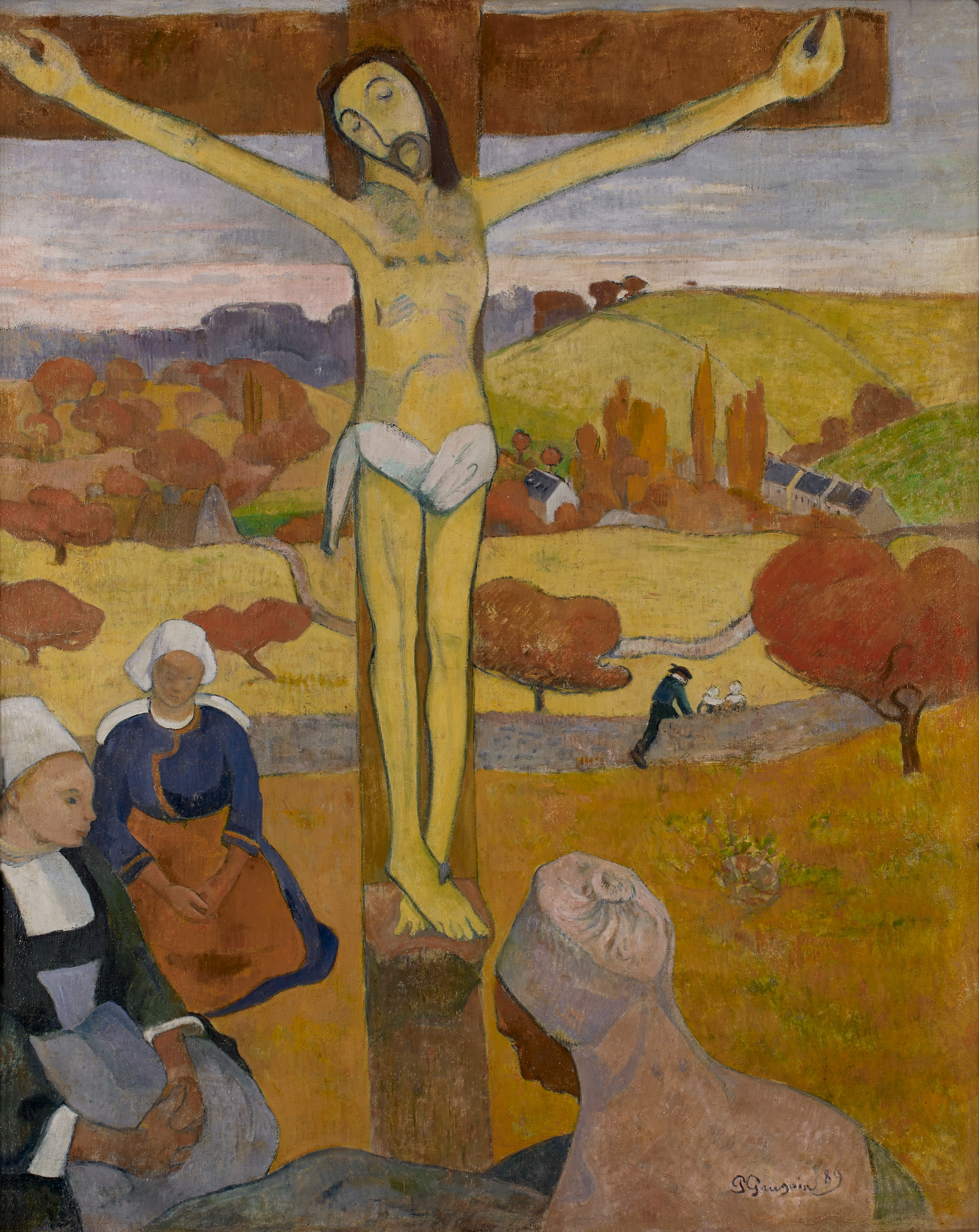
- Artist: Paul Gauguin
- Year: 1889
- Medium: Oil on canvas
- Dimensions: 91.1 cm × 73.4 cm (35.9 in × 28.9 in)
- Location: Buffalo AKG Art Museum, Buffalo, New York

The Yellow Christ (French: Le Christ jaune) is a painting executed by Paul Gauguin in 1889 in Pont-Aven. Together with The Green Christ, it is considered to be one of the key works of Symbolist painting.

Gauguin first visited Pont-Aven in 1886. He returned to the village in early 1888 to stay until mid-October, when he left to join Vincent van Gogh in Arles, for little more than two months. Early in 1889, Gauguin was back to Pont-Aven to stay there until spring 1890. It was only for a short visit in summer 1889 to Paris to see the Exposition universelle and to arrange the Volpini Exhibition that Gauguin interrupted this sojourn. Soon after his return to Pont-Aven he painted The Yellow Christ.

The painting is a symbolic piece that shows the crucifixion of Jesus Christ taking place in 19th-century northern France as Breton women are gathered in prayer. Gauguin relies heavily on bold lines to define his figures and reserves shading only for the women. The autumn palette of yellow, red and green in the landscape echoes the dominant yellow in the figure of Christ. The bold outlines and flatness of the forms in this painting are typical of the cloisonnist style.

A study for The Yellow Christ in pencil is preserved in the Thyssen-Bornemisza Museum, and a version in watercolor is in the collection of the Art Institute of Chicago, gift of Elizabeth F. Chapman.

== Gallery ==
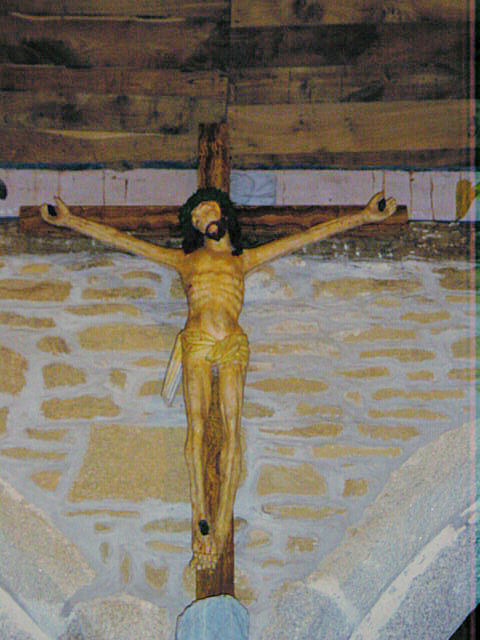
The Crucifix of Trémalo, Pont-Aven, an anonymous wood sculpture, 189 x 133 cm

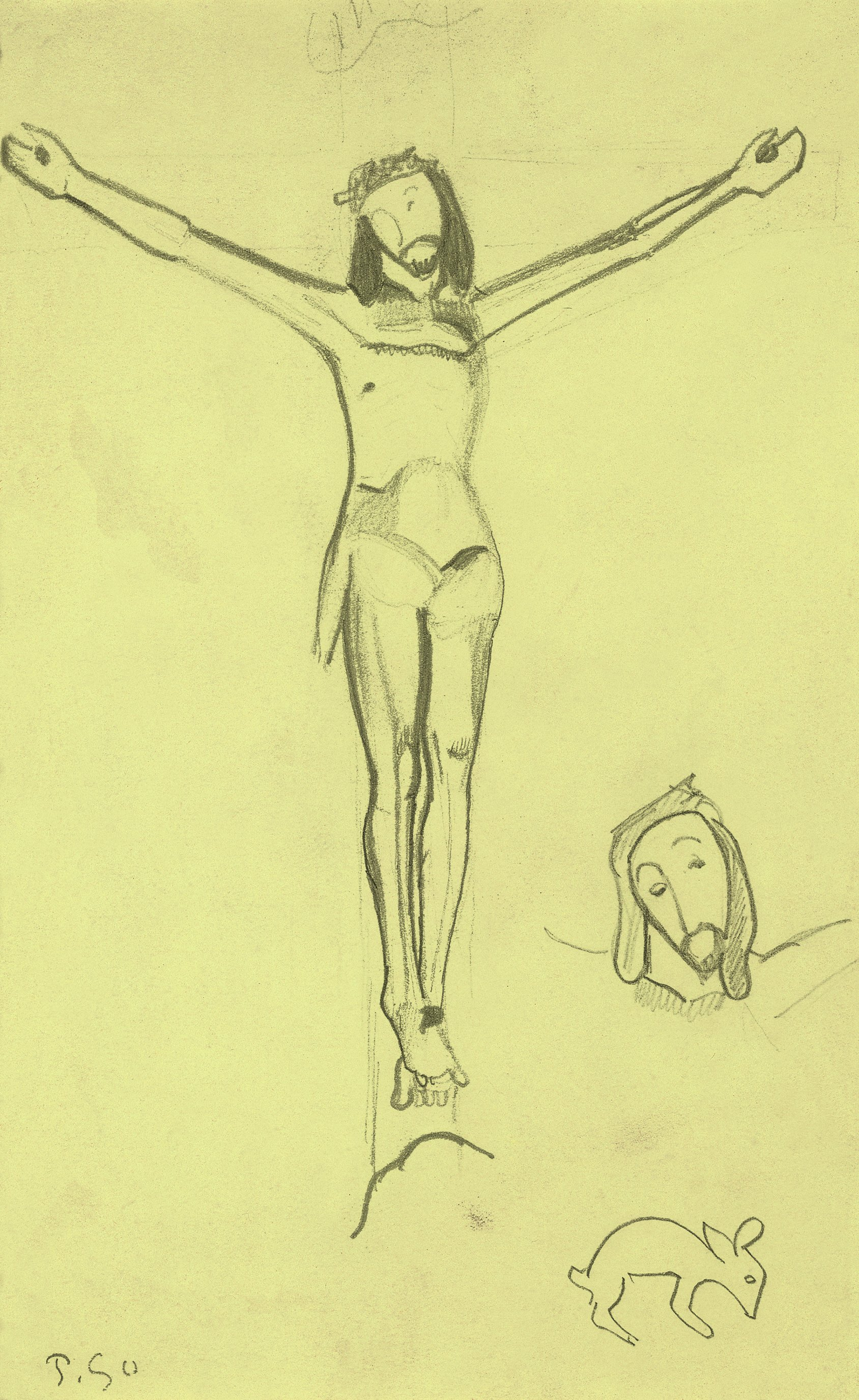
Sketch for "The Yellow Christ", 26.7 x 18.2 cm, Thyssen-Bornemisza Museum

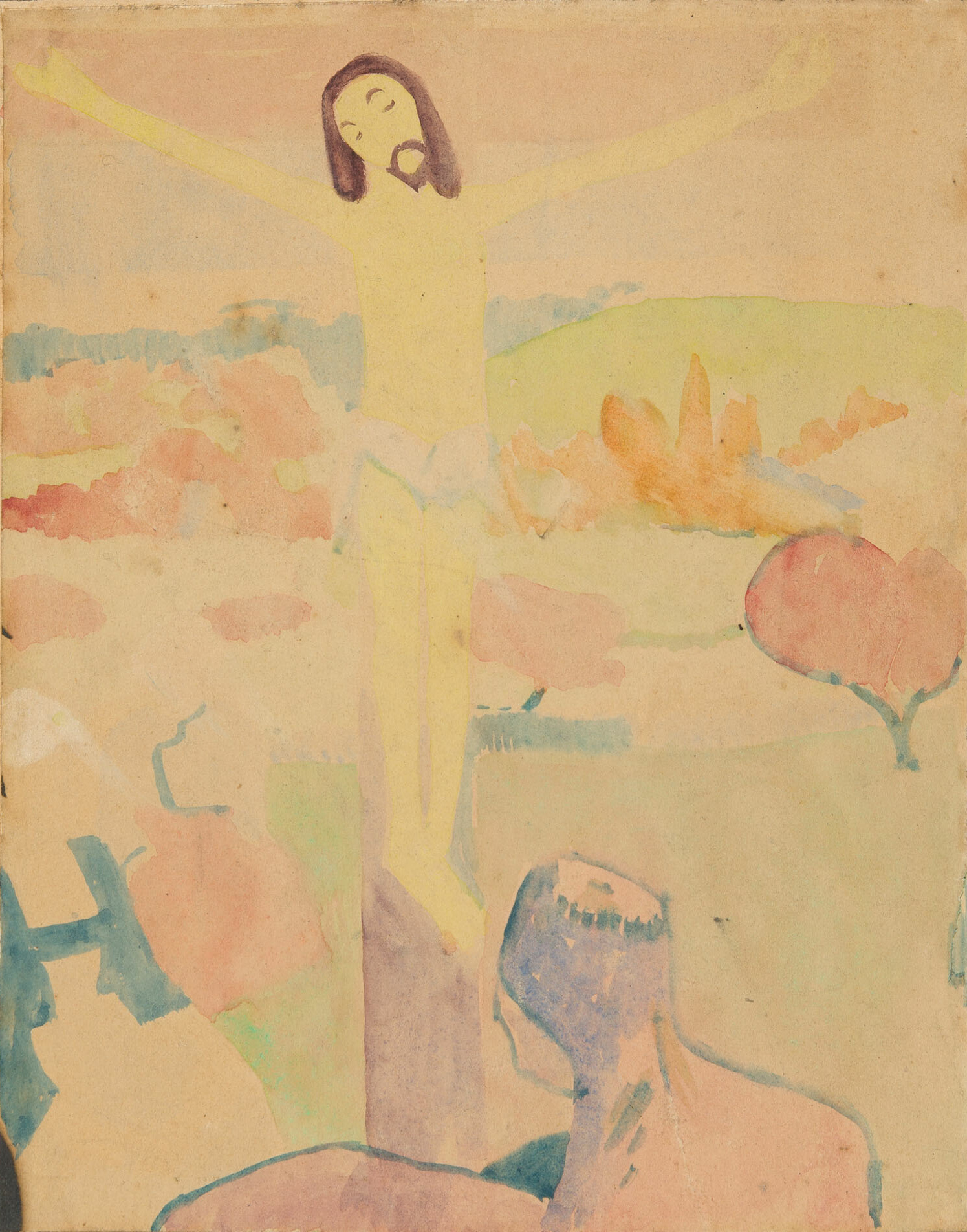
The Yellow Christ (watercolor), c. 1889, 15.4 x 12.3 cm, Art Institute of Chicago

Self-portrait with the Yellow Christ (Autoportrait au Christ jaune), 1890–1891, by Paul Gauguin, oil on canvas, 38 x 46 cm, Musée d'Orsay, Paris, depicts the painting reversed, "mirrored".

== See also ==
- Pont-Aven School
- Cloisonnism
- List of paintings by Paul Gauguin
