= The Ravine of the Peyroulets =

1889 painting by Vincent van Gogh

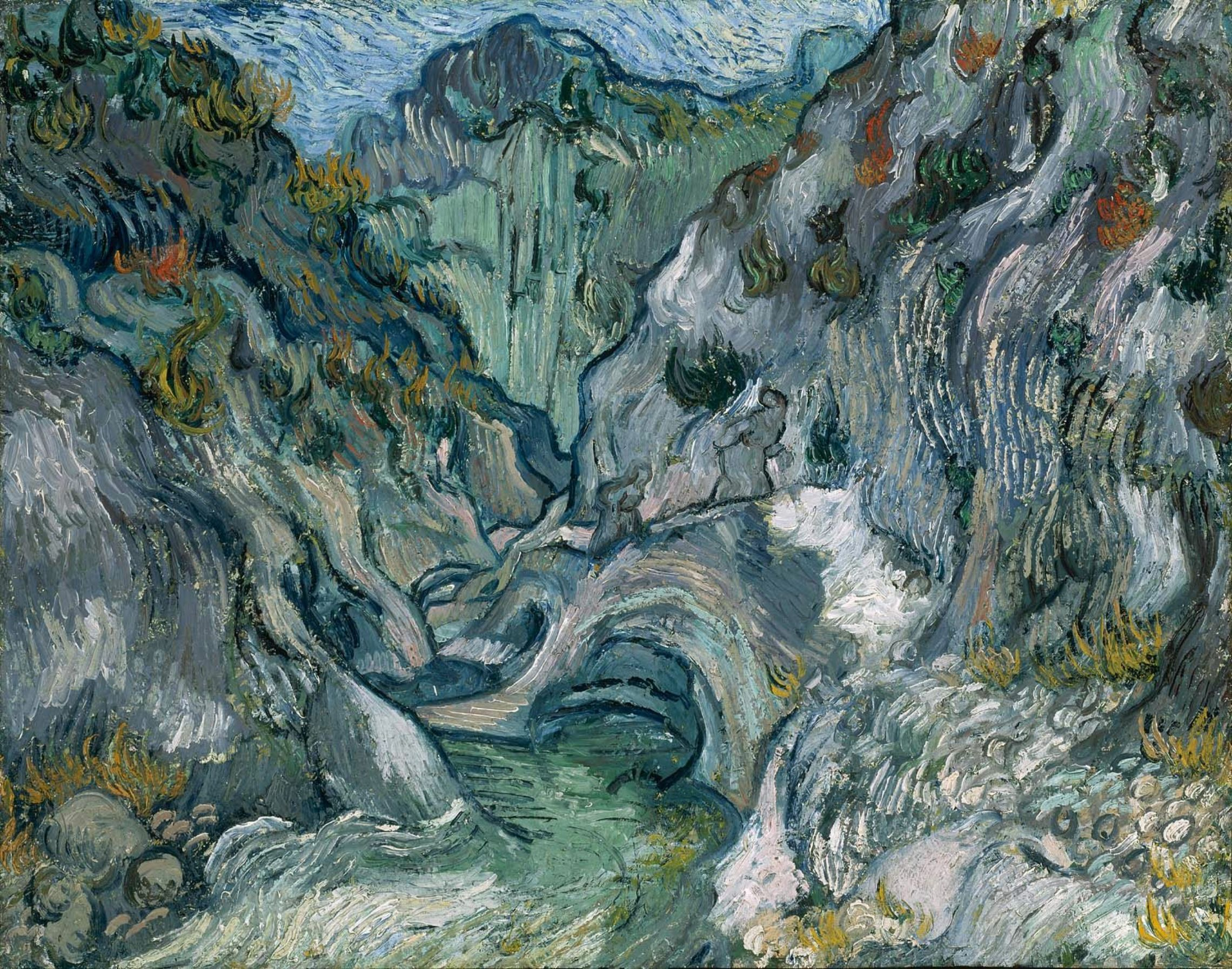
- Artist: Vincent van Gogh
- Year: 1889
- Catalogue: F662; JH1804
- Medium: Oil on canvas
- Dimensions: 73 cm × 91.7 cm (29 in × 36.1 in)
- Location: Museum of Fine Arts; Boston, Massachusetts

The Ravine of the Peyroulets, or The Ravine is an 1889 oil painting by the Dutch Post-Impressionist painter Vincent van Gogh. It is part of a large series of paintings created during a time of extraordinary creative activity for the artist in the last year of his life, after he had committed himself to the Saint-Paul Asylum near Saint-Rémy-de-Provence.

It was painted in late autumn, and Van Gogh wrote to his friend Émile Bernard: "Such subjects certainly have a fine melancholy, but then it is fun to work in rather wild places, where one has to dig one's easel in between the stones lest the wind should blow the whole caboodle over."

The following spring Van Gogh sent it to Paris, where Paul Gauguin admired the painting and responded saying: "In subjects from nature you are the only one who thinks. I talked about it with your brother, and there is one that I would like to trade with you for one of mine of your choice. The one I am talking about is a mountain landscape. Two travelers, very small, seem to be climbing there in search of the unknown…Here and there, red touches like lights, the whole in a violet tone. It is beautiful and grandiose."

Later another Van Gogh painting, Wild Vegetation, was discovered underneath as it had been painted over by the Dutchman. The work is now in the permanent collection of the Boston Museum of Fine Arts, most recently displayed at Gallery 244, "Dutch and Flemish Art".

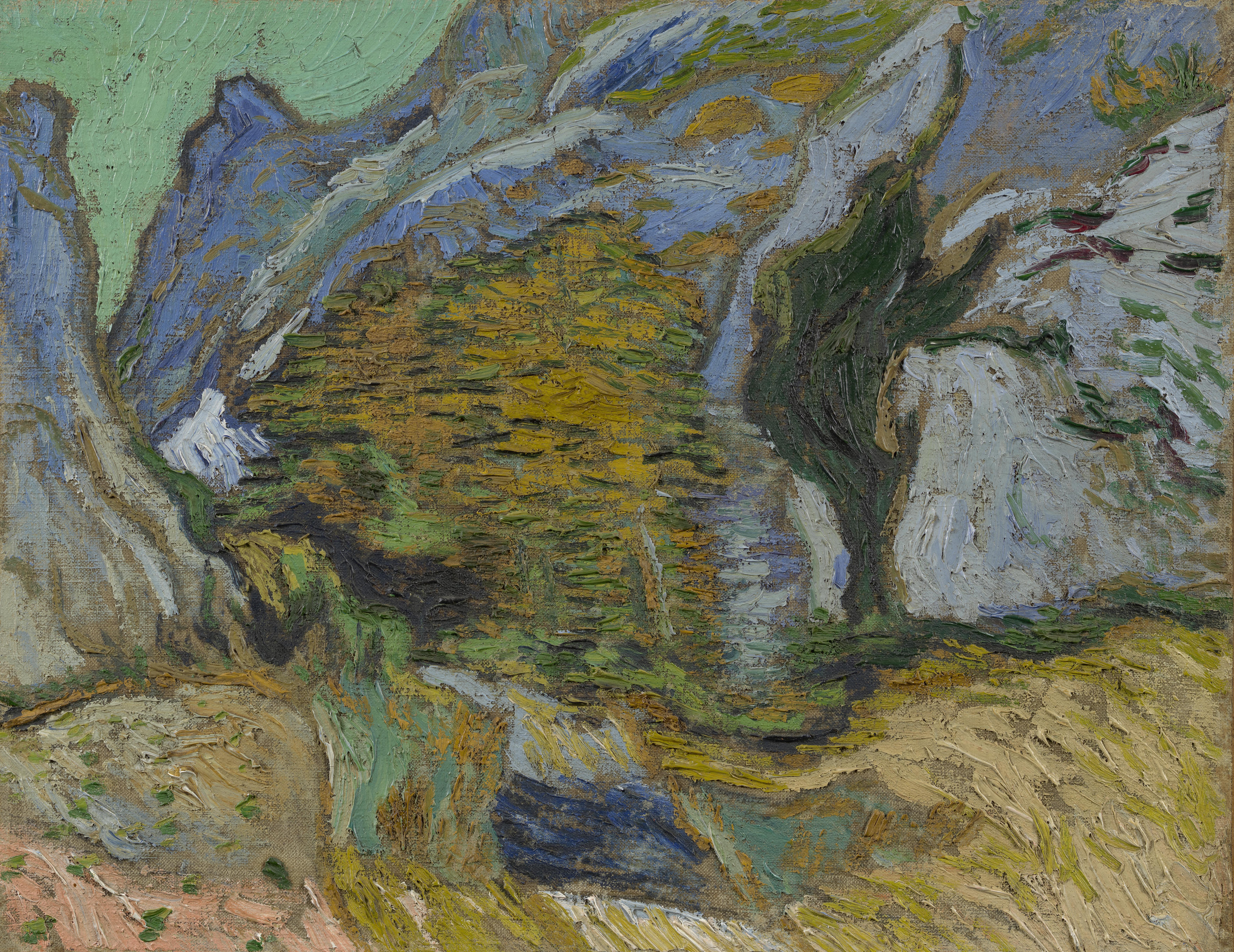
Ravine with a Small Stream, another version of painting, October 1889, Van Gogh Museum, Amsterdam (F645)

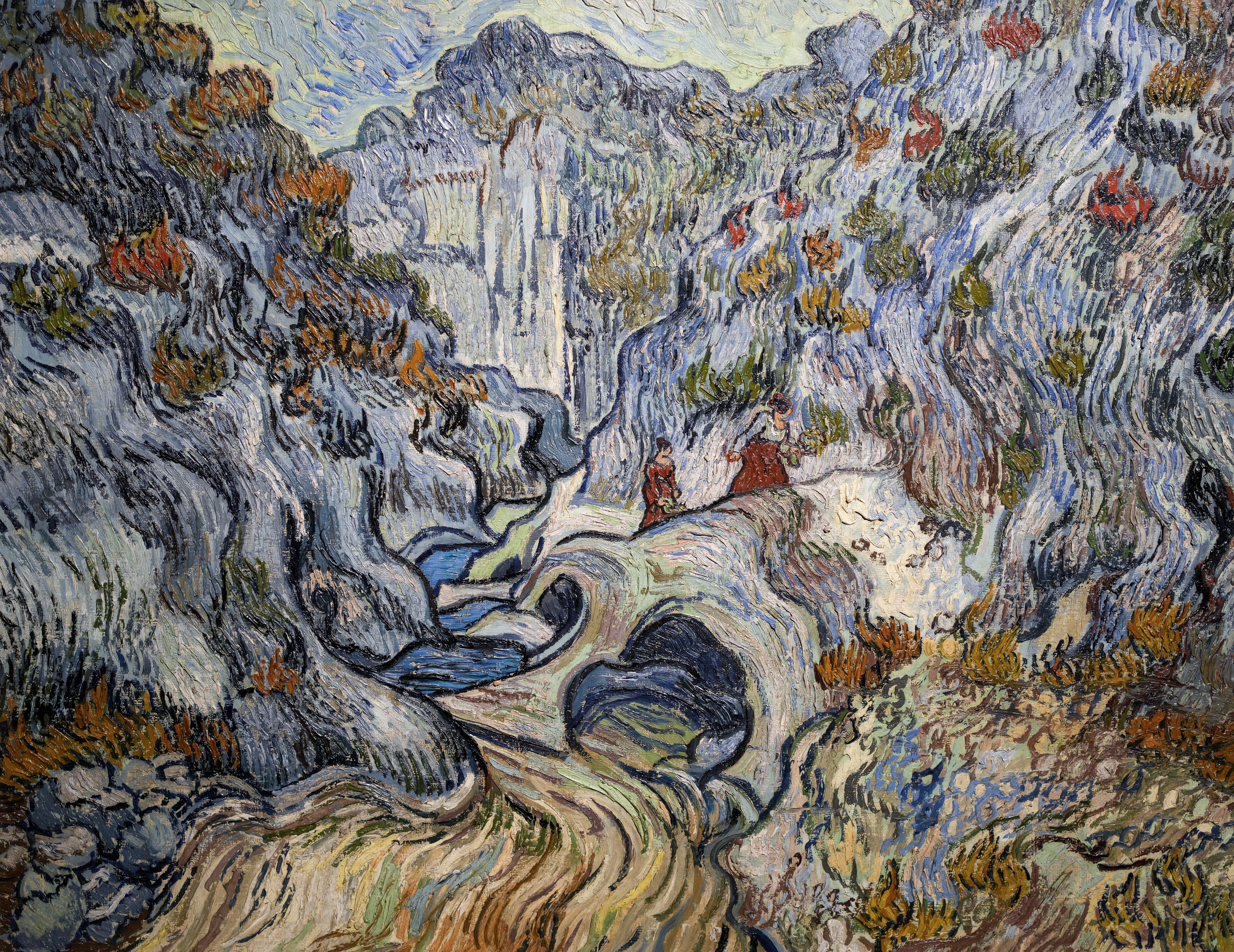
The Gorge "Les Peiroulets", Another version of painting, December 1889, Kröller-Müller Museum, (F661)

== See also ==
- List of works by Vincent van Gogh
