= Butterflies (Van Gogh series) =

1889–90 series of paintings by Vincent van Gogh

Great Peacock Moth
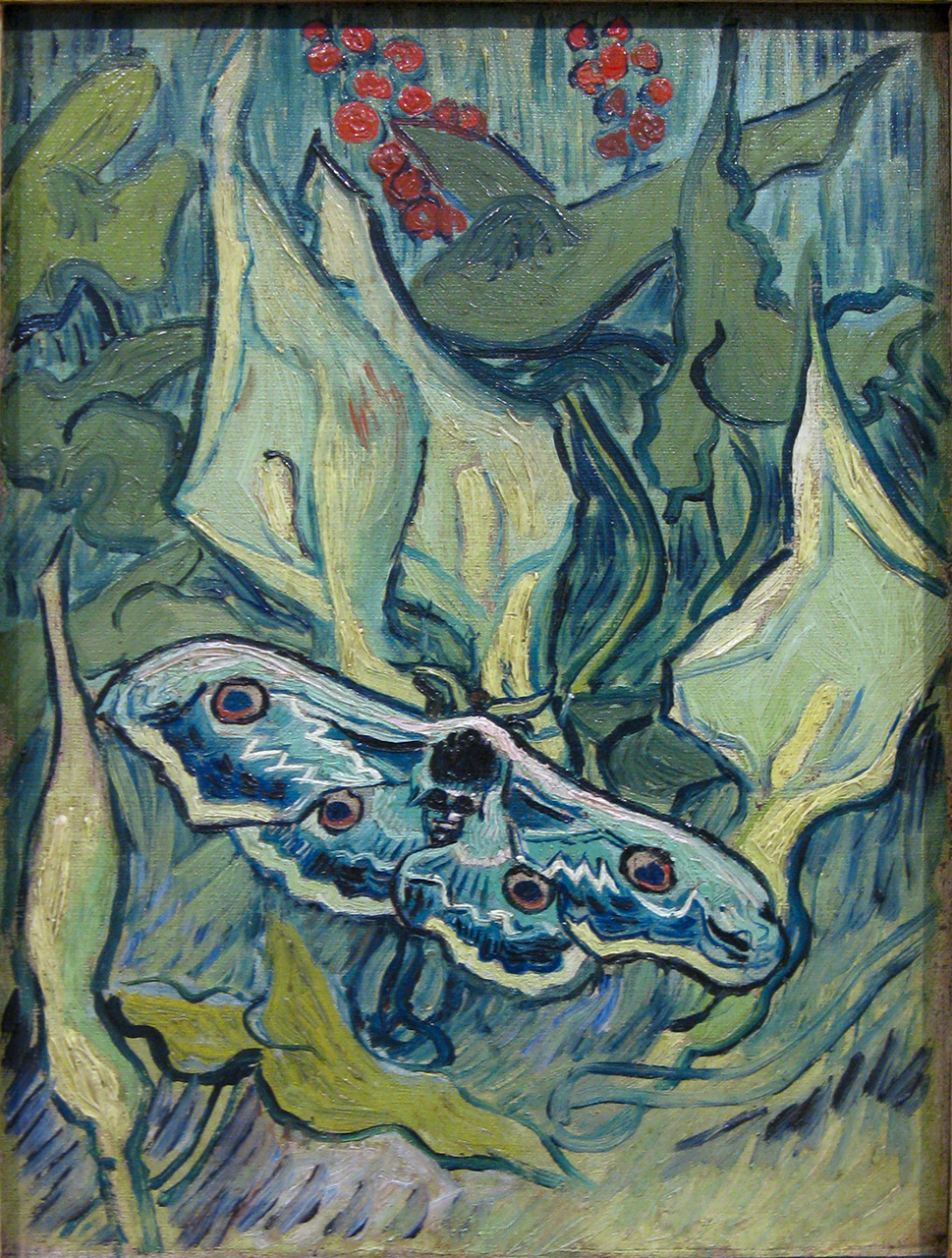
- Artist: Vincent van Gogh
- Year: May, 1889
- Catalogue: F610, JH1702
- Medium: Oil on canvas
- Dimensions: 33.5 cm × 24.5 cm (13.2 in × 9.6 in)
- Location: Van Gogh Museum; Amsterdam

Butterflies is a series of paintings made by Vincent van Gogh in 1889 and 1890. Van Gogh made at least four paintings of butterflies and one of a moth. The metamorphosis of the caterpillar into a butterfly was symbolic to Van Gogh of men and women's capability for transformation.

== Butterflies and moths ==
Butterflies and moths, in the insect order Lepidoptera, are distinguished generally in several ways: Butterflies are brighter in color and fly in the day. Butterfly wings are not linked and fold together when they are in a resting position. On the other hand, moths are generally duller in color, fly at night and have linked wings. There are some exceptions, though, such as a few types of colored moths.

== Butterflies as a subject ==
Butterflies are found in art and literature, often as symbols of freedom, transformation and life. Van Gogh used butterflies in his works as a symbol of hope.

One of his favorite metaphors was about transformative possibilities. In a letter to his sister Wil, Van Gogh says that like a grub eats salad roots, unknowing of the transformation that will take it to a beetle, we are not aware of our potential for metamorphosis. Similarly, he as a "painter ought to paint pictures; possibly something else will come after that." Of prostitutes, such as those he met at brothels, Van Gogh wondered of any woman who fell into a life of degradation: "She is seeking, seeking, seeking -- does she herself know what? Might she be transformed one day like a grub into a butterfly?" That hope may have been on Van Gogh's mind when he took in pregnant Sien Hoornik, a prostitute, and her daughter when he lived in The Hague in 1882.

In a letter to his friend Émile Bernard, Van Gogh uses the miracle of transformation from caterpillar to butterfly to consider what possibilities may be available in the universe: "However, since nothing confutes the assumption that lines and forms and colours exist on innumerable other planets and suns as well, we are at liberty to feel fairly serene about the possibilities of painting in a better and different existence, an existence altered by a phenomenon that is perhaps no more ingenious and no more surprising than the transformation of a caterpillar into a butterfly or of a grub into a maybug. The existence of a painter-butterfly would be played out on the countless celestial bodies which, after death, should be no more inaccessible to us than the black dots on maps that symbolize towns and villages are in our earthly lives."

When in need of solace, nature is where Van Gogh went to find peace. In a letter to his sister Wilhelmina he writes that he finds to calm down it is best to "look at a blade of grass, the branch of a fir tree, an ear of wheat. So if you want to do, as the artists do, go look at the red and white poppies with their bluish leaves, their buds soaring on gracefully bent stems."

== Paintings made in Arles ==
Van Gogh came to Arles in southern France when he was about 35 years of age. There he began producing some of his best work. The sunflower paintings, some of the most recognizable of Van Gogh's paintings, were created in this time. This is likely one of Van Gogh's happier periods of life. He is confident, clear-minded and seemingly content. In a letter to his brother, Theo, he wrote, "Painting as it is now, promises to become more subtle - more like music and less like sculpture - and above all, it promises color." As a means of explanation, Van Gogh explains that being like music means being comforting.

=== Grass and Butterflies ===
Grass and Butterflies, made in Arles, is part of a private collection.

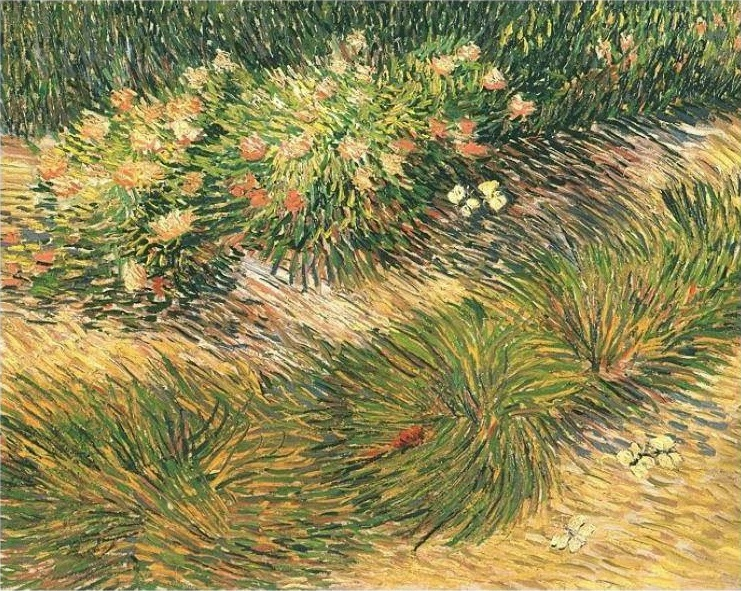
Grass and Butterflies (b/w photo)
April, 1889
Private collection (F460)

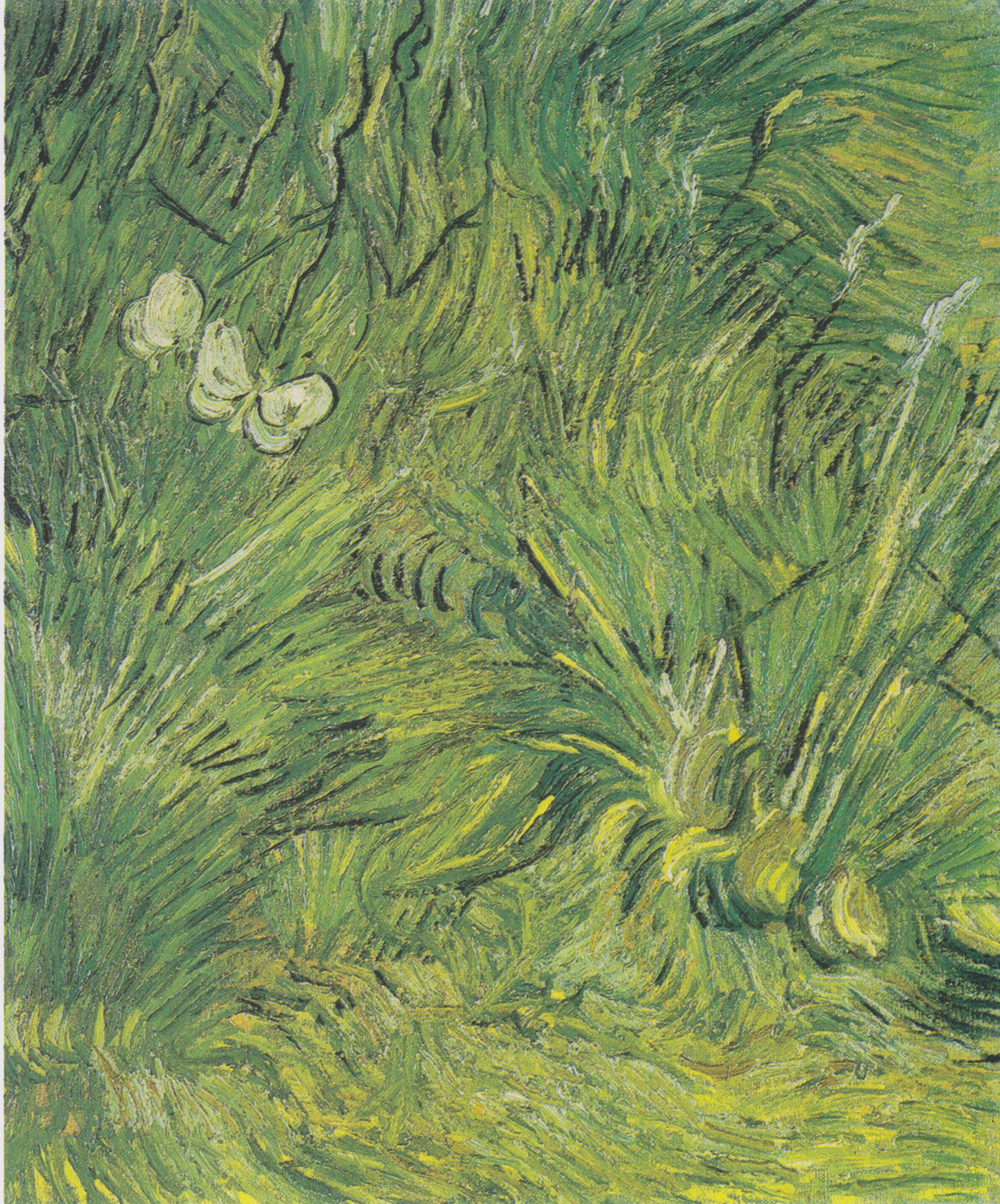
Two White Butterflies
Spring 1889
Van Gogh Museum, Amsterdam (F402)

=== Two White Butterflies ===
Fascinated by butterflies at a young age, Vincent Dethier became an entomologist. In tribute to him on his seventieth birthday, Miriam Rothschild expressed her appreciation metaphorically through Van Gogh's painting: "Two white butterflies twirling in freedom and winged delight. For me they are the symbol of daydreaming — the poetry that Vince Dethier insinuates so cunningly into our factual information and knowledge. For the gift, of these special white butterflies — along with all your official and unofficial students, past, present and future — Vince Dethier, I tender you my most heartfelt and grateful thanks."

Another interpretation of Two White Butterflies describes fragile white butterflies that fly over a field of turning grass, evoking a sense of foreboding.

=== Groupings of butterfly and garden paintings ===
Jennifer Helvey, author of Irises: Vincent van Gogh in the Garden, groups five garden paintings that Van Gogh made in Arles due to stylist similarity. This grouping includes two butterfly paintings: Two White Butterflies and Grass and Butterflies. She found the paintings seem true, natural reflections of gardens, with a top-down perspective. The works in the grouping share a similar color palette and rhythmic brushstrokes. Iris appears, though, to have been subject to greater study: the single plant centered and the brushstrokes of the grass radiating out from the iris.

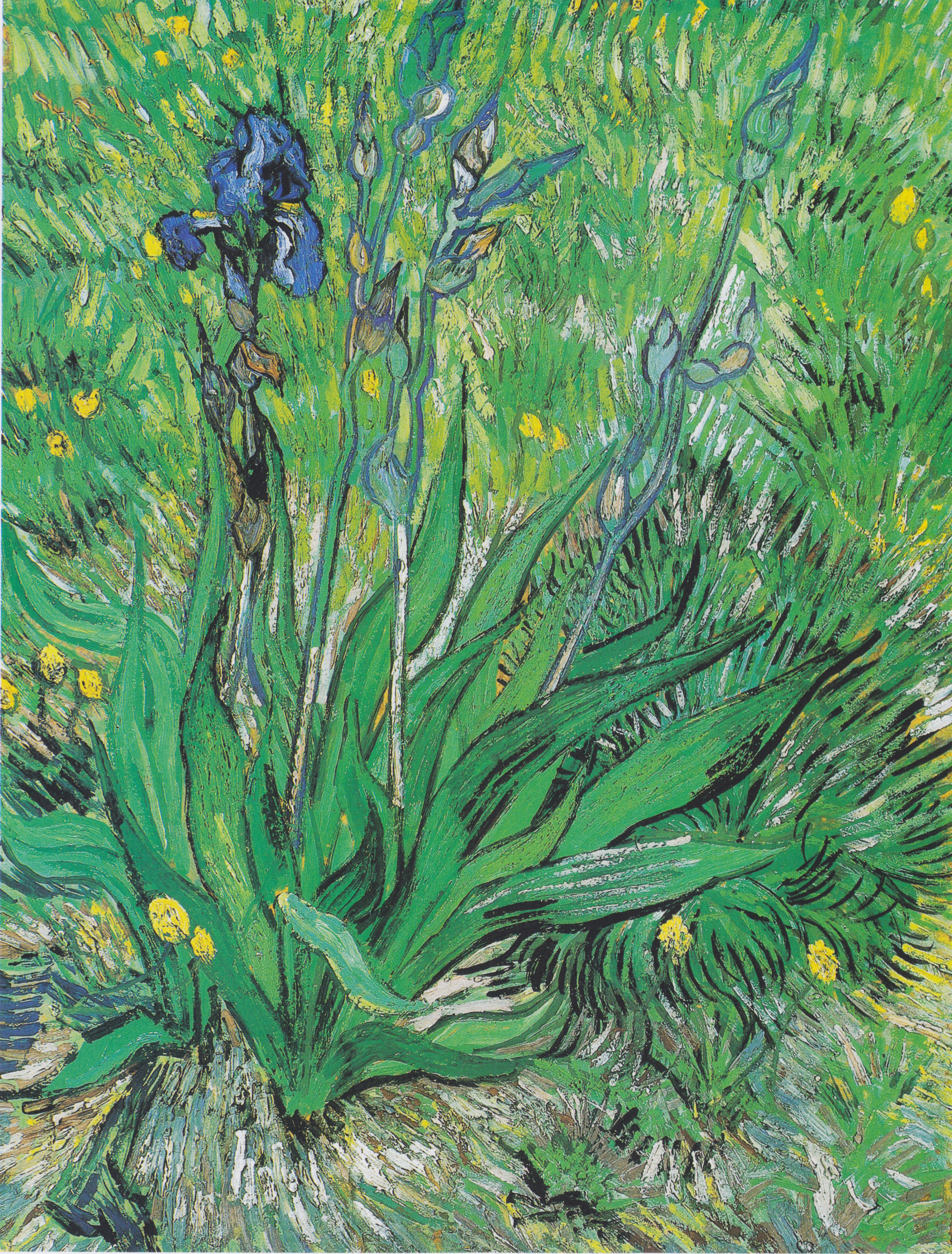
Iris
1889
National Gallery of Canada, Ottawa (F601)

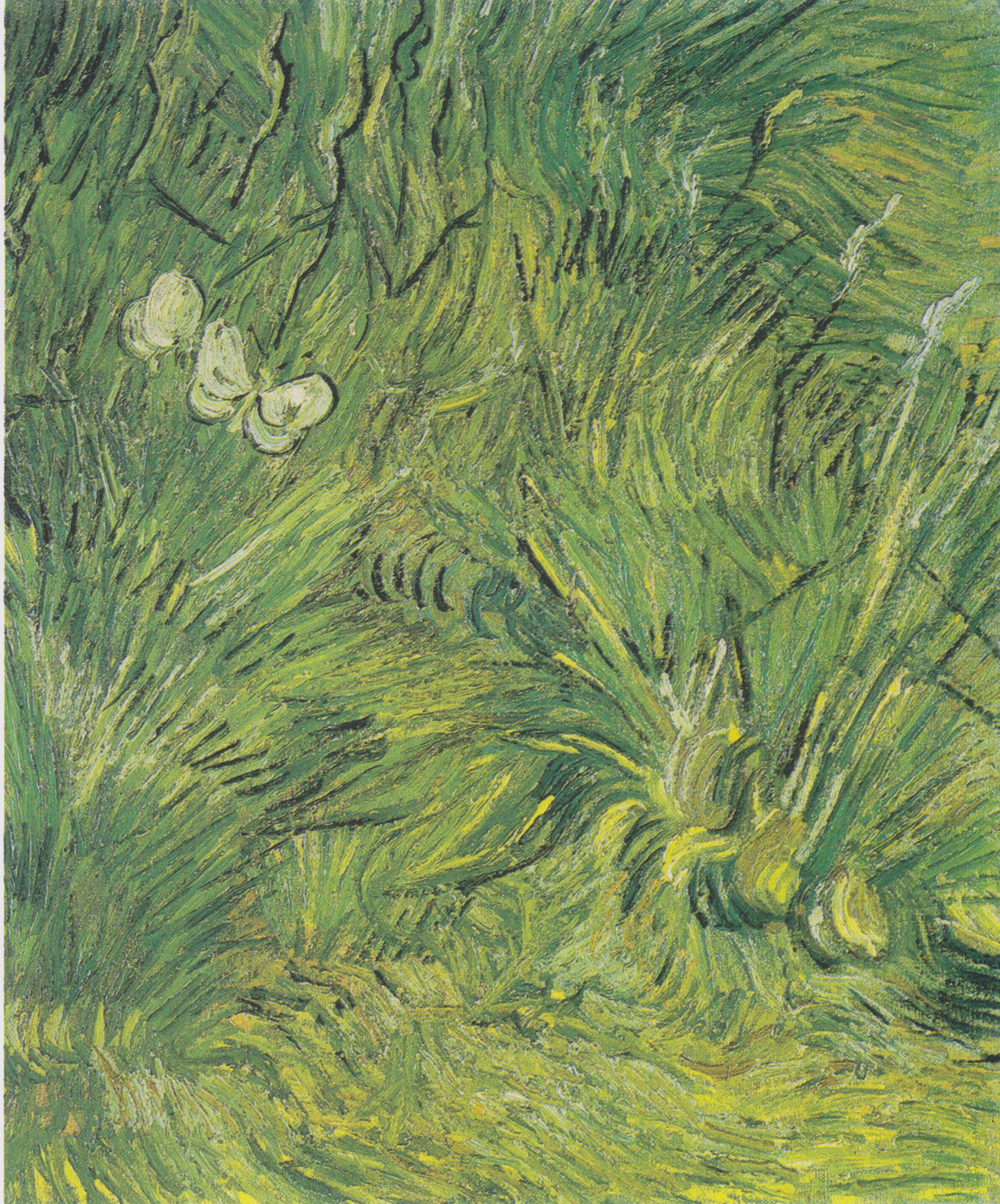
Two White Butterflies also Garden with Butterflies
Spring 1889
Van Gogh Museum, Amsterdam (F402)

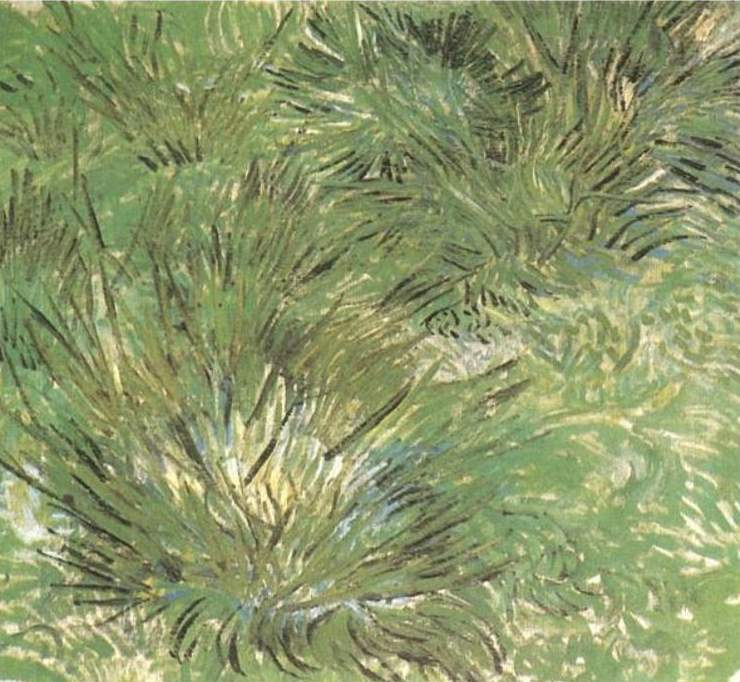
Clumps of Grass
1889
Private collection (F582)

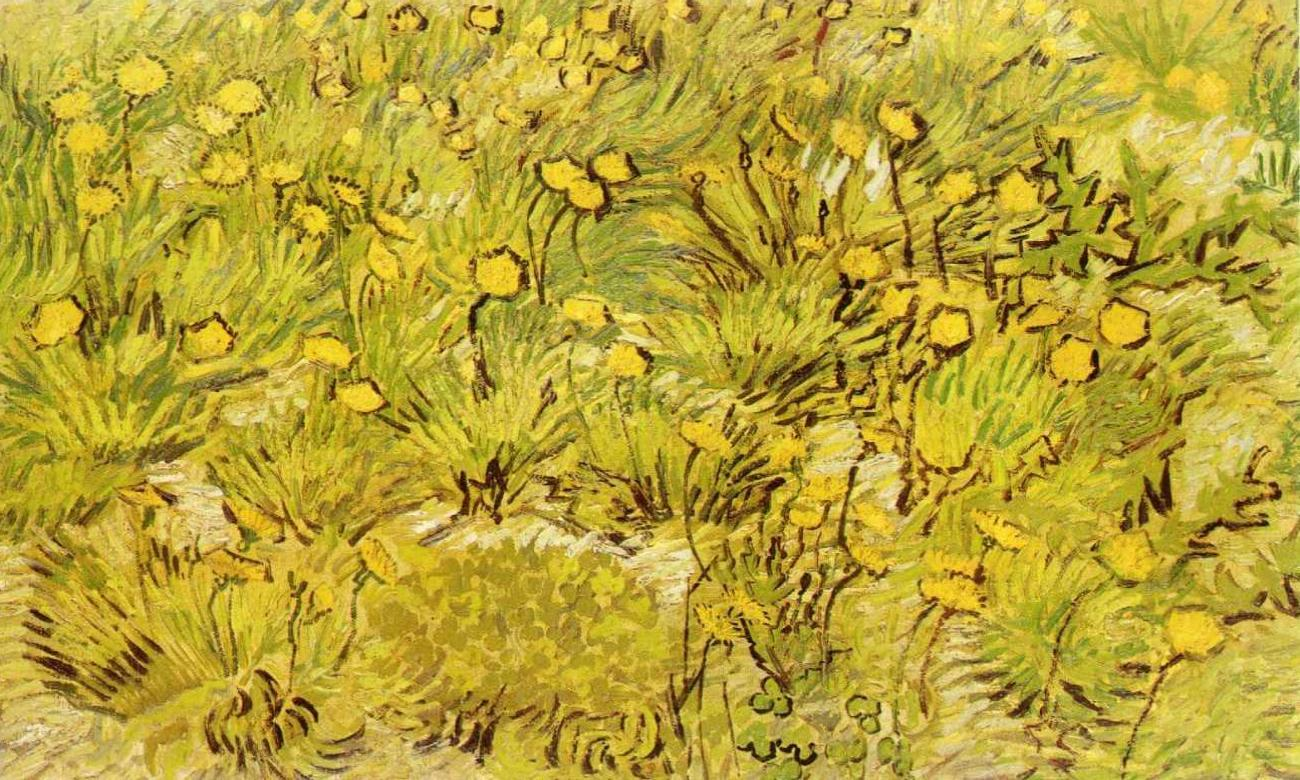
A Field of Yellow Flowers 1889
Kuntzmuseum, Winterthur, Switzerland (F584)

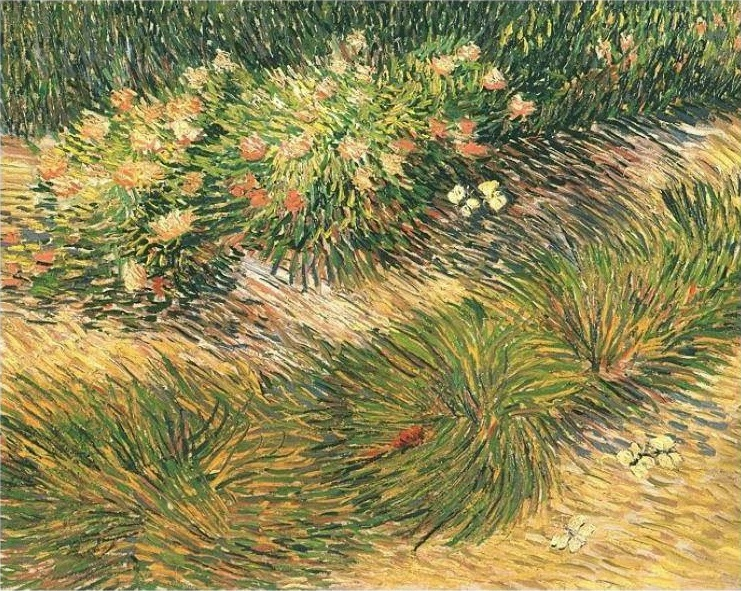
Grass and Butterflies (b/w photo)
April, 1889
Private collection (F460)

Helvey also offers another grouping with the two butterfly paintings from Arles and Tree Trunks in the Grass made at Saint-Rémy:

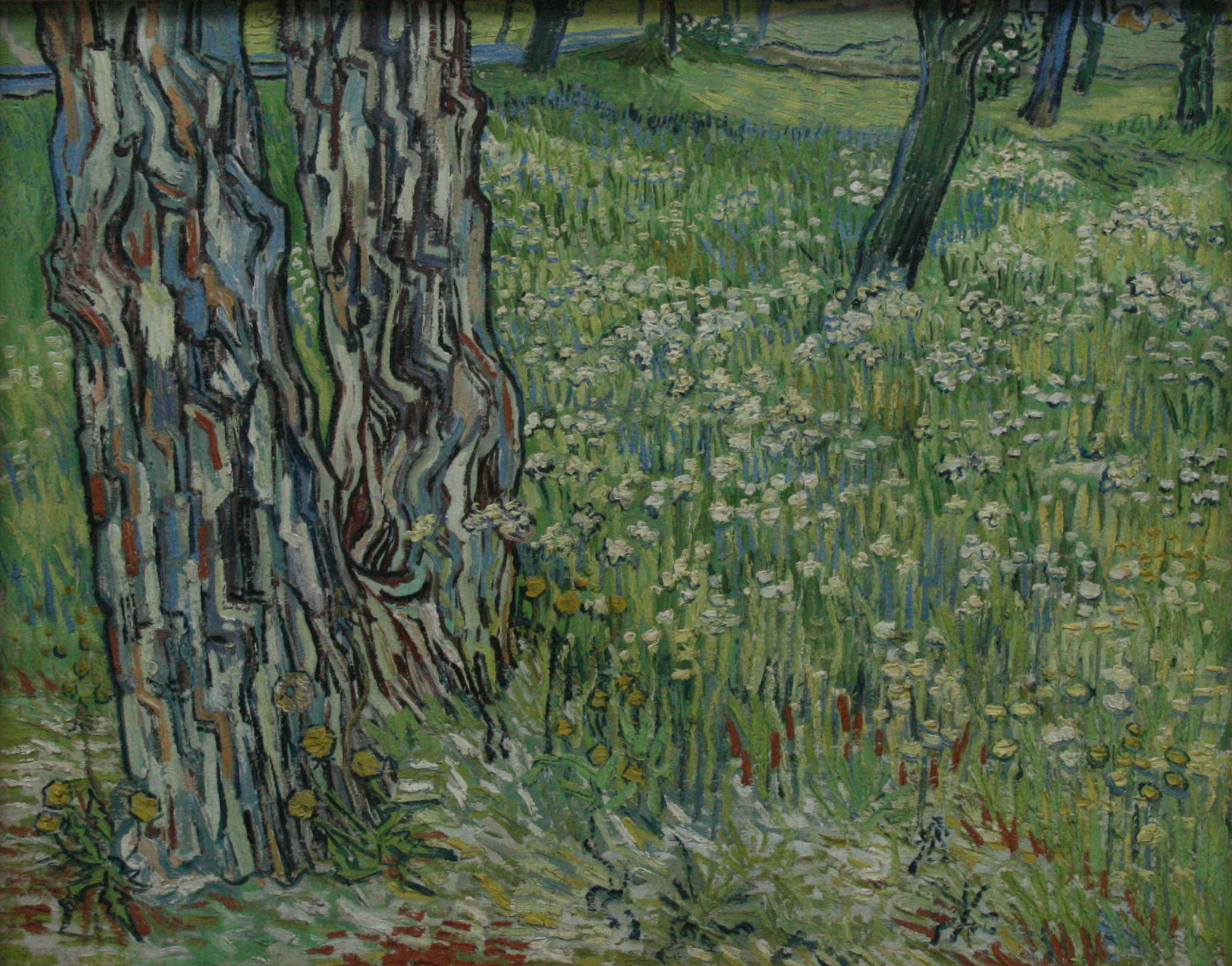
Tree Trunks in the Grass
1890
Kröller-Müller Museum, Otterlo (F676)

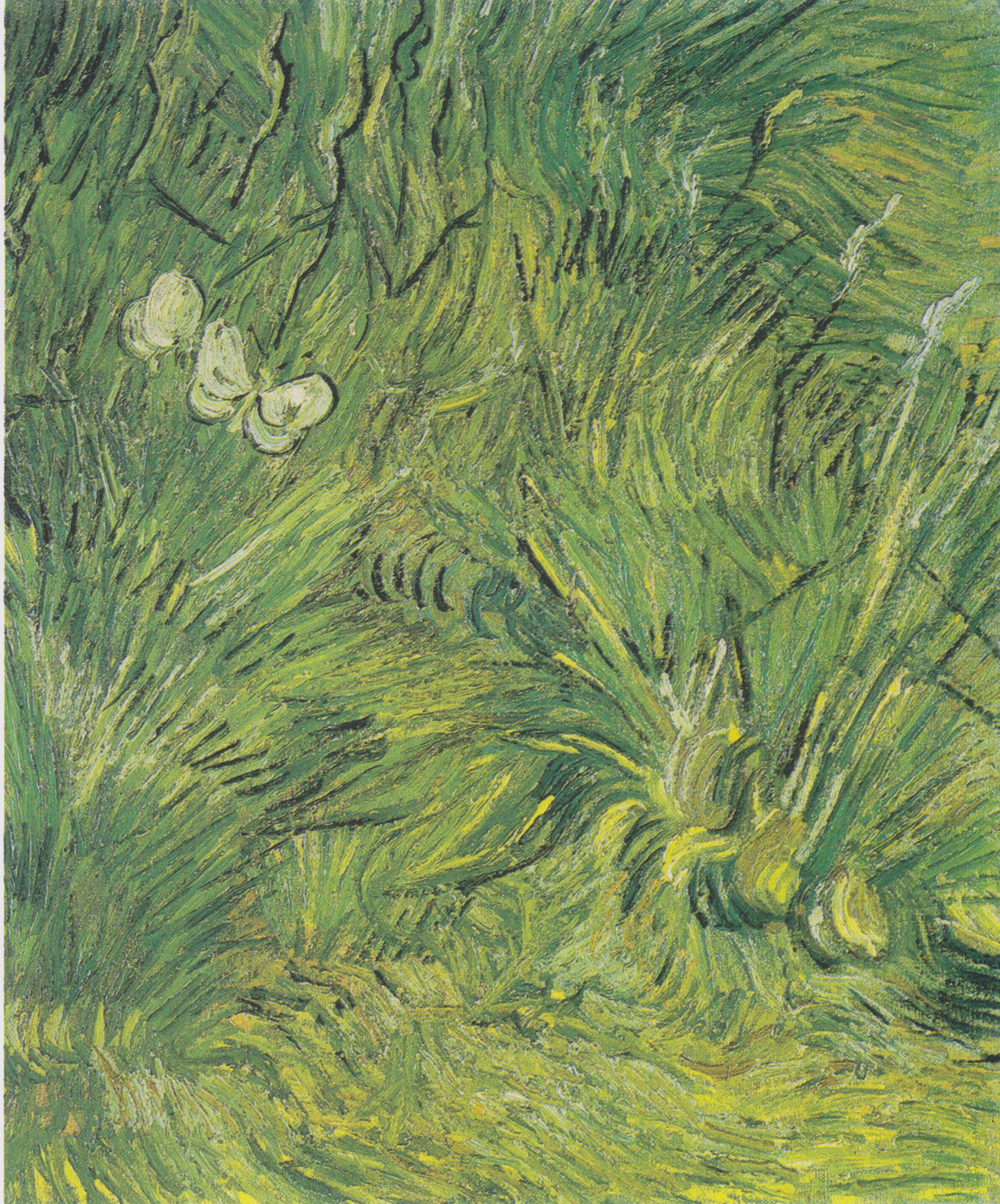
Two White Butterflies also Garden with Butterflies
Spring 1889
Van Gogh Museum, Amsterdam (F402)

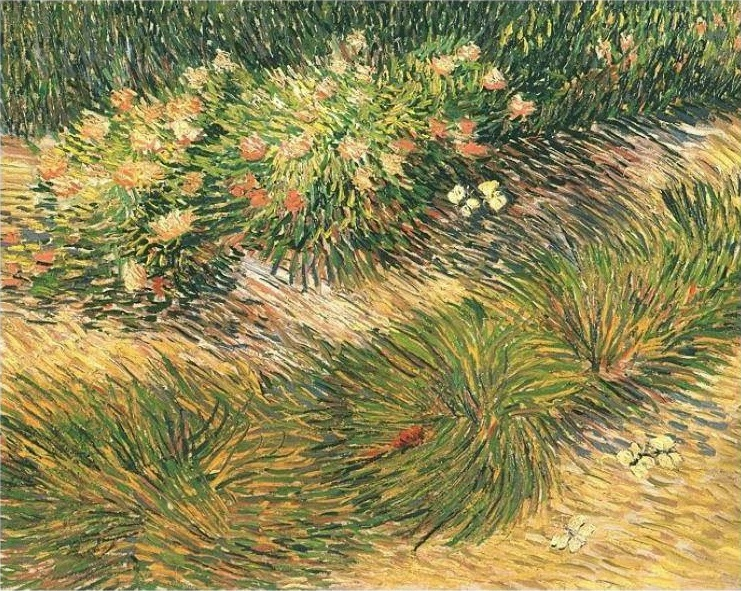
Grass and Butterflies (b/w photo)
April, 1889
Private collection (F460)

== Paintings made in Saint-Rémy ==
For one year, from May 1889 to May 1890, Van Gogh was voluntarily admitted at the asylum at Saint-Rémy, which is near Arles. During that time he was often restricted to working within the asylum's grounds. Within the grounds of the asylum he painted ivy covered trees, lilacs, and irises of the garden.

=== Green Peacock Moth ===
In May 1889 Van Gogh began work on Green Peacock Moth which he self-titled Death's Head Moth. The moth, called death's head, is a rarely seen nocturnal moth. He described the large moth's colors "of amazing distinction, black, grey, cloudy white tinged with carmine or vaguely shading off into olive green." Behind the moth is a background of Lords-and-Ladies. The size of the moth and plants in the background pull the spectator into the work. The colors are vivid, consistent with Van Gogh's passion and emotional intensity. Van Gogh Museum's title for this work is Emperor Moth.

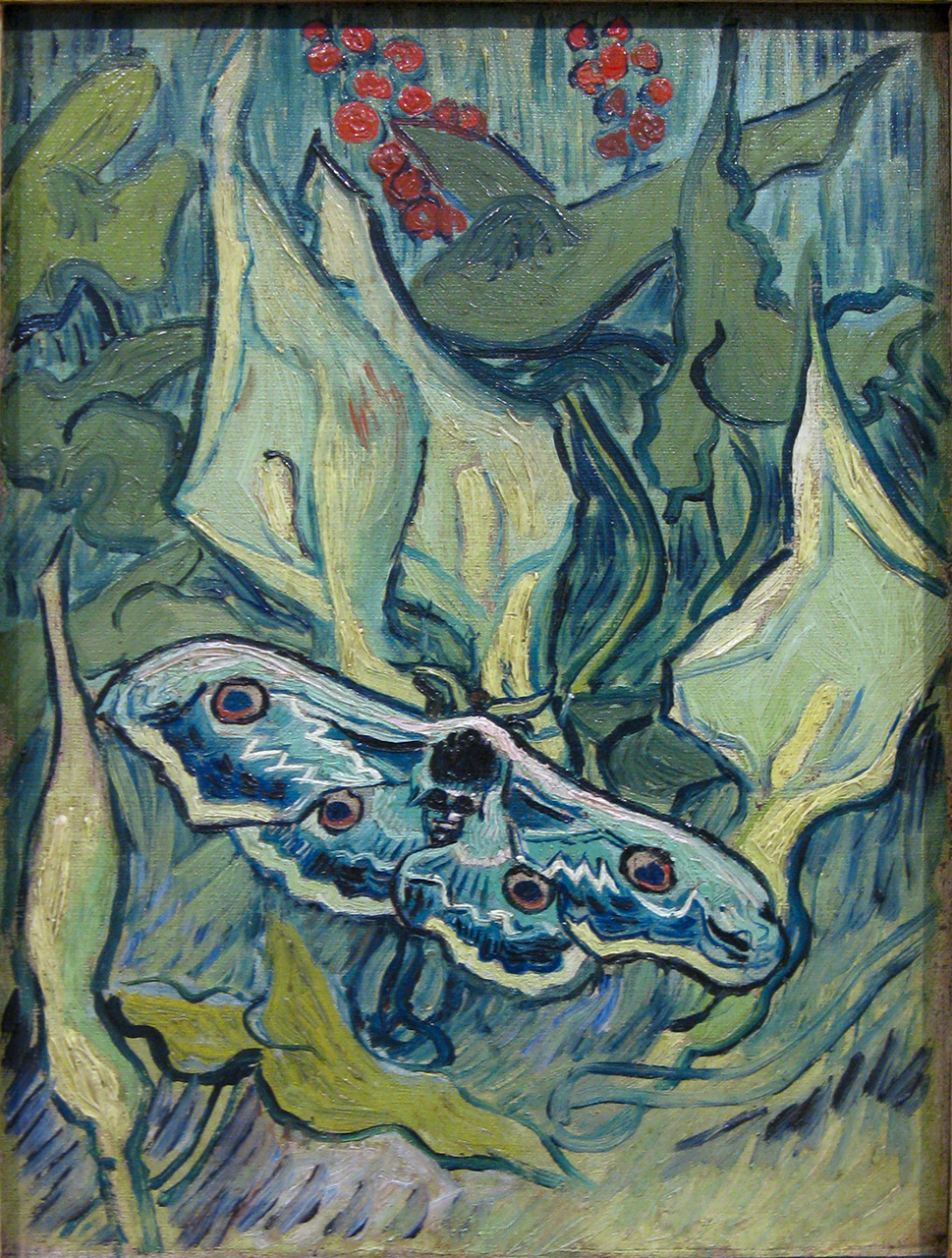
Green Peacock Moth
May, 1889
Van Gogh Museum, Amsterdam (F610)

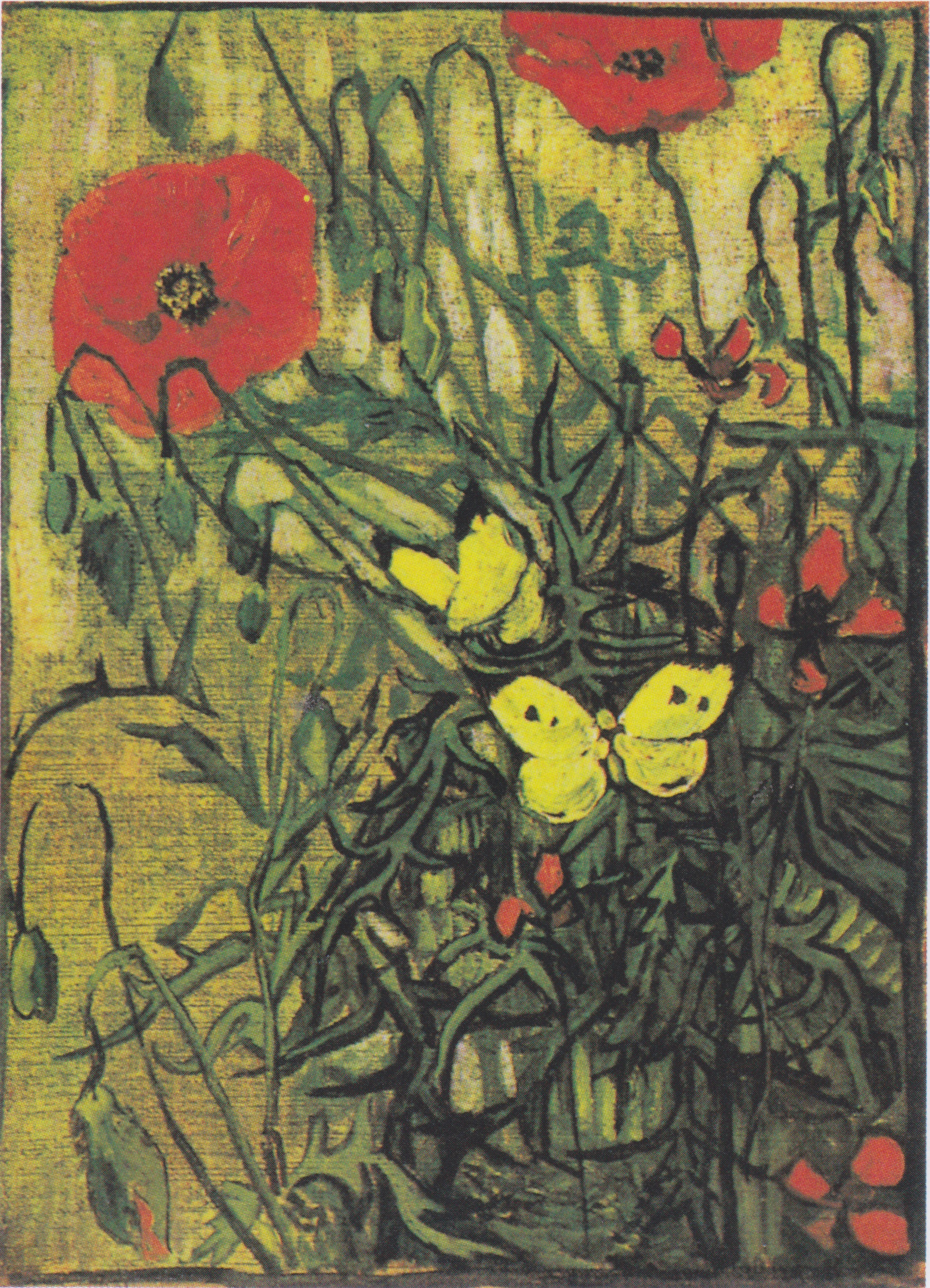
Poppies and Butterflies
April—May, 1890
Van Gogh Museum, Amsterdam (F748)

=== Poppies and Butterflies ===
Debra Mancoff, author of Van Gogh's Flowers, describedPoppies and Butterflies: "vivid red poppies and the pale yellow butterflies float on the surface of twisting dark stems and nodding buds, all against a yellow-gold background. Although composed of natural motifs, Van Gogh's layering of pattern in Butterflies and Poppies suggests a decorative quality like that of a textile or a screen." Mancoff compared this study to the Japanese prints he admired.

Butterflies and Poppies is an artwork by Vincent Van Gough, Vincent completed the artwork in 1889. Butterflies and poppies was painted onto a canvas with oil paints. Vincent used a lot of layers in Butterflies and Poppies to create an almost textile-like feel. Using very fine brush strokes also helped to create this illusion. Vincent painted his series, Butterflies, in Arles, southern France where he rented ‘the yellow house’. Vincent was around 35 years of age, this time is considered his best period for his paintings. Another series created in this region is Sunflower. The painting features two yellow butterflies resting on some red poppies with a pale bluish background.

In The Existential Butterfly, a book of poetry about butterflies and nature, Curtis Farmwald wrote of van Gogh's Poppies and Butterflies:

"Though it was painted
Years ago in another country
By the troubled Vincent van Gogh,
The painting could have been done
Right here sometime this summer.
I’ve seen red poppies like those
Growing wild just down the road.
Yellow sulphurs like those
Are all over my yard.
Can their beauty still inspire
A troubled soul to survive?"

Indicating his desire to make the painting, in 1888 Van Gogh mentions hoping to make a better version of butterflies or the field of poppies while in Arles.

=== Long Grass with Butterflies ===
London's National Gallery painting Long Grass with Butterflies, also called Meadow in the Garden of Saint-Paul Hospital, is a view of an abandoned garden with tall unkempt grass and weeds on the asylum grounds. The work was made towards the end of his stay in Saint-Rémy.

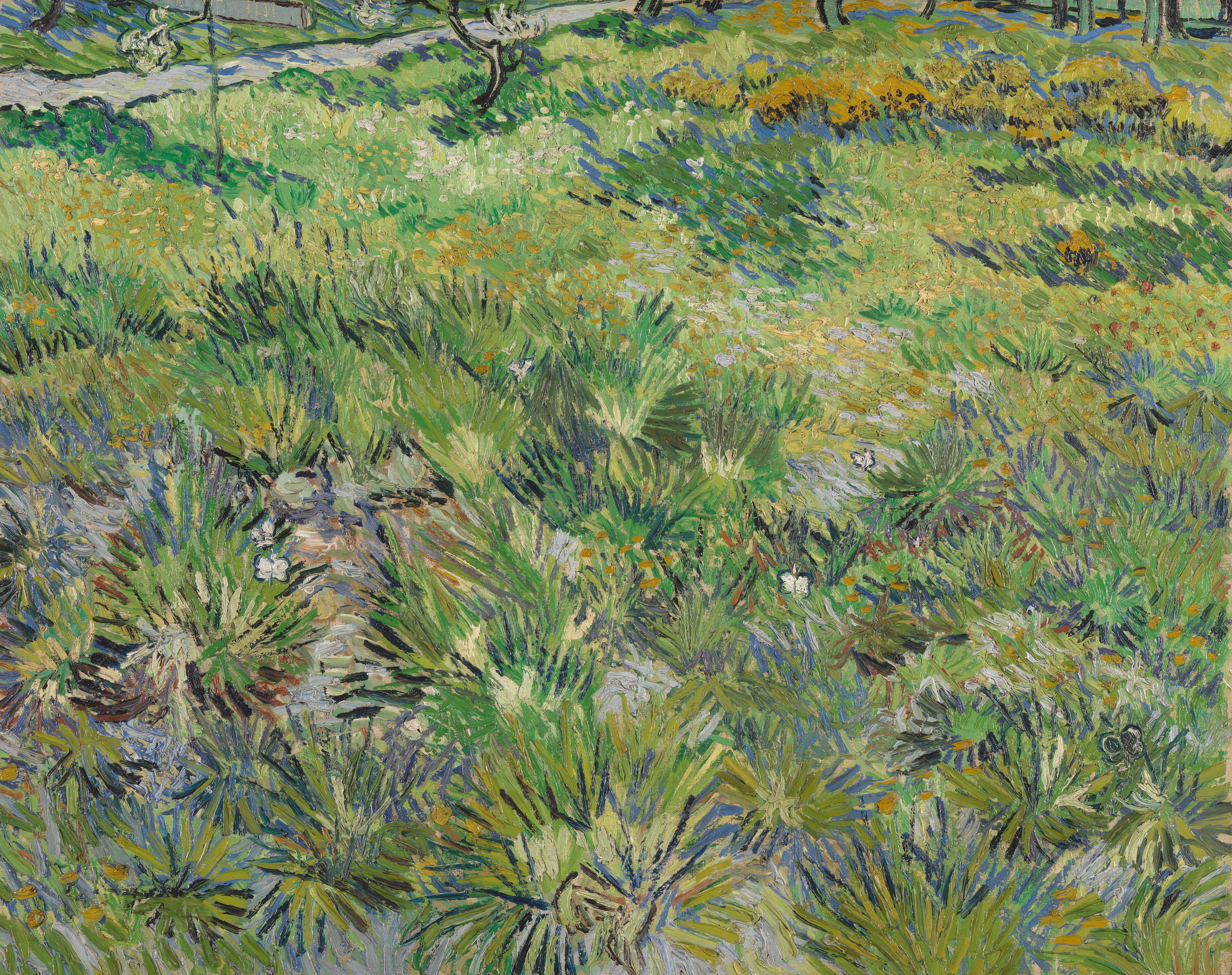
Long Grass with Butterflies
May 1890
National Gallery, London (F672)

== Lost Butterfly painting ==
In 1888 Van Gogh also worked on a "study of dusty thistles, with an innumerable swarm of white and yellow butterflies," but the painting was lost.

== Paintings that include butterflies ==
- Pink Peach Tree in Blossom (Reminiscence of Mauve) Vincent van Gogh

== See also ==
- List of works by Vincent van Gogh
