= A Road at Saint-Remy with Female Figure =

1889 painting by Vincent van Gogh

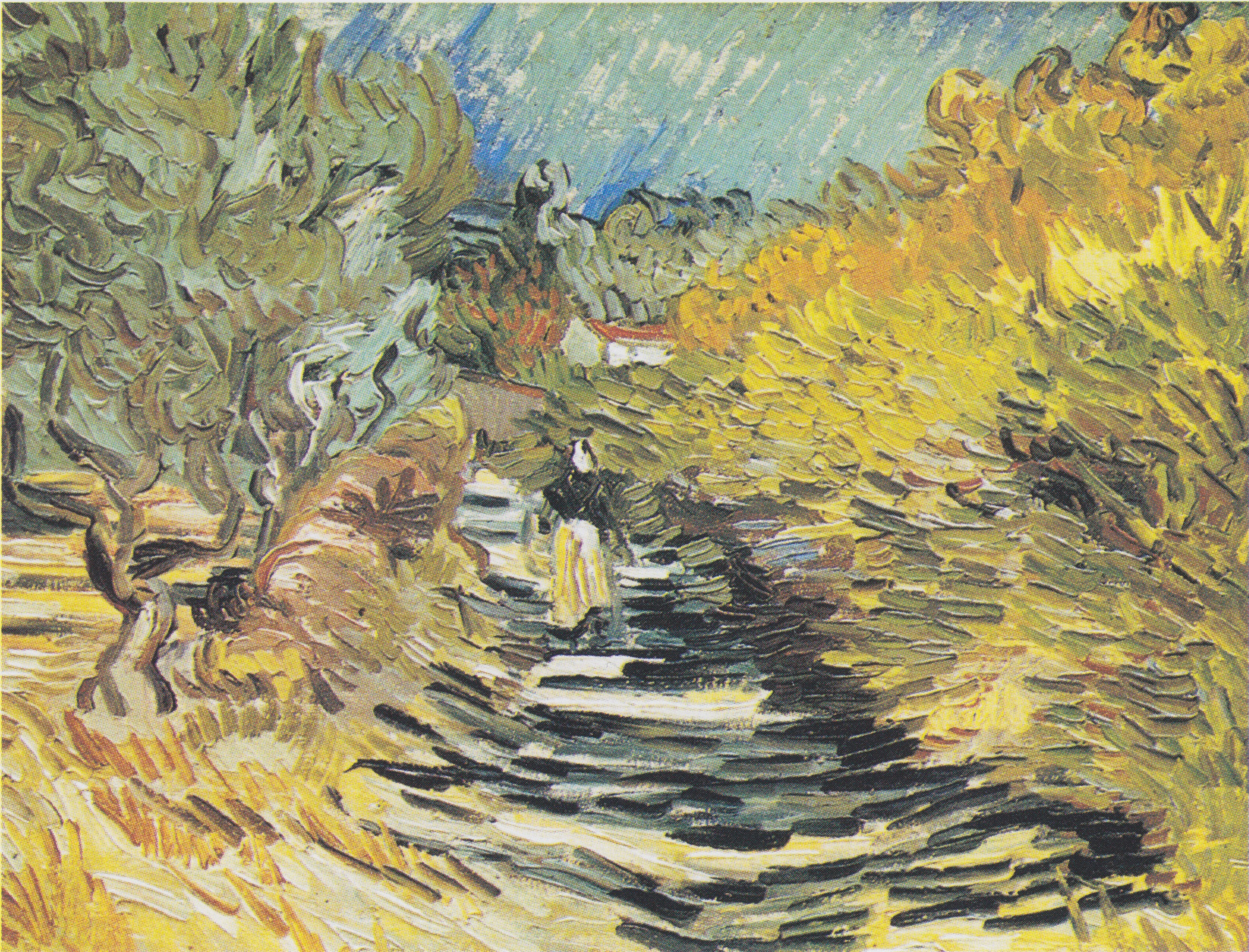
- Artist: Vincent van Gogh
- Year: 1889
- Catalogue: F728; JH1875
- Medium: Oil on canvas
- Dimensions: 32.5 cm × 40.5 cm (12.8 in × 15.9 in)
- Location: Kasama Nichidō Museum of Art; Kasama, Japan

Vincent van Gogh painted A Road at Saint-Remy with Female Figure while staying in Saint-Remy in 1889. The distinctive painting style of Van Gogh's later works is very apparent in this painting as the road, vegetation and sky is all rendered with his thick characteristic brush strokes.

The painting depicts a woman walking towards a house at the end of a small road at Saint-Remy in France. The sides of the road is covered in green and yellow vegetation as fall has set in, and the fall also seems to have brought its winds. There is some contrast between the windy yellow and green vegetation which dominates the female figure, and the blue open sky overhead.

== See also ==
- List of works by Vincent van Gogh
