= The Green Christ =

1889 painting by Paul Gauguin

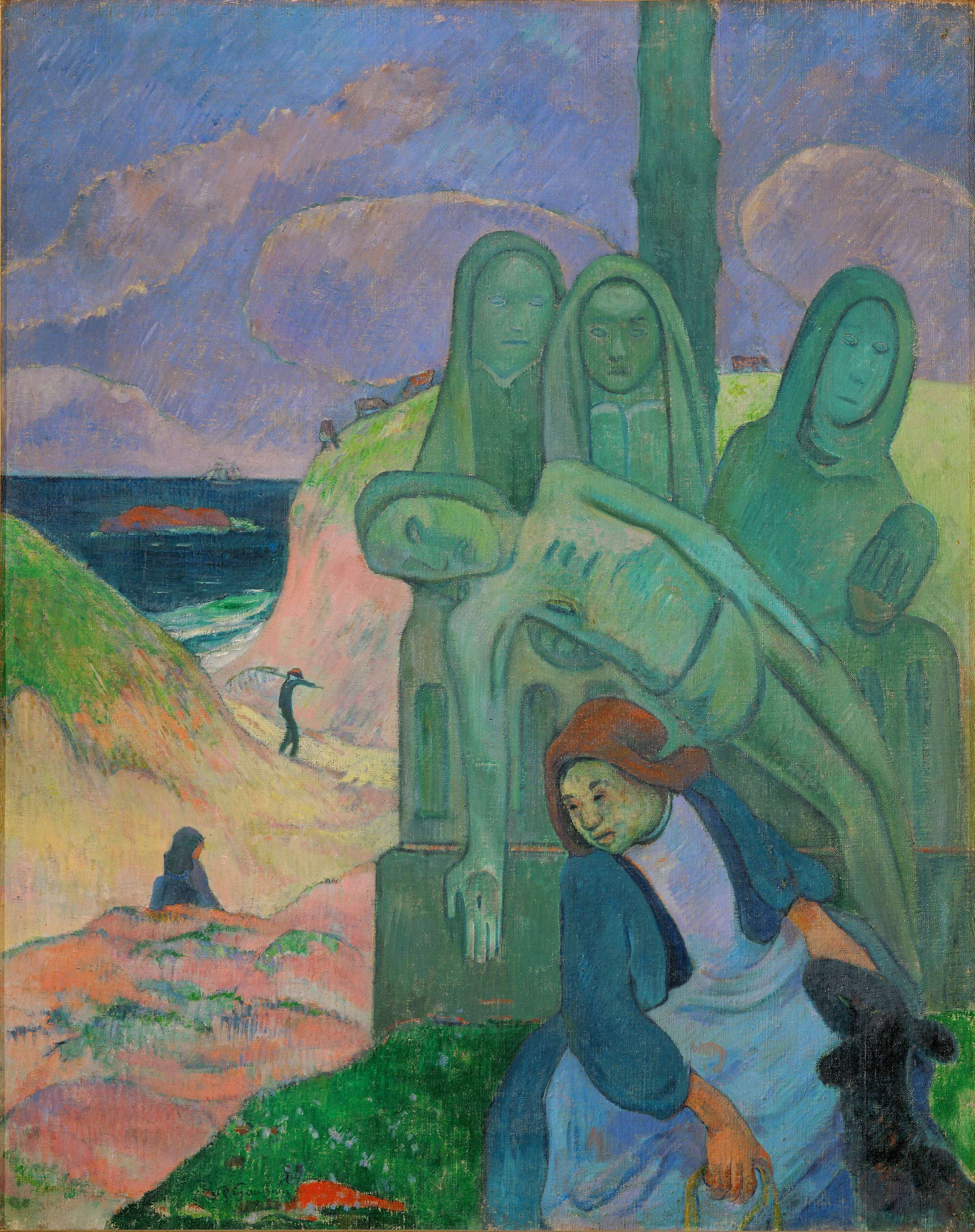
- Artist: Paul Gauguin
- Year: 1889
- Medium: Oil on canvas
- Dimensions: 92 cm × 73 cm (36 in × 29 in)
- Location: Royal Museums of Fine Arts of Belgium, Brussels

The Green Christ (in French: Le Christ vert) is an oil-on-canvas painting executed by Paul Gauguin on November 20, 1889 in Pont-Aven, Brittany. It depicts a Breton woman at the foot of a calvary, or green-tinted sculpture of Christ's crucifixion. This image emphasizes both Breton culture and religious symbolism.

== Background & cultural context ==
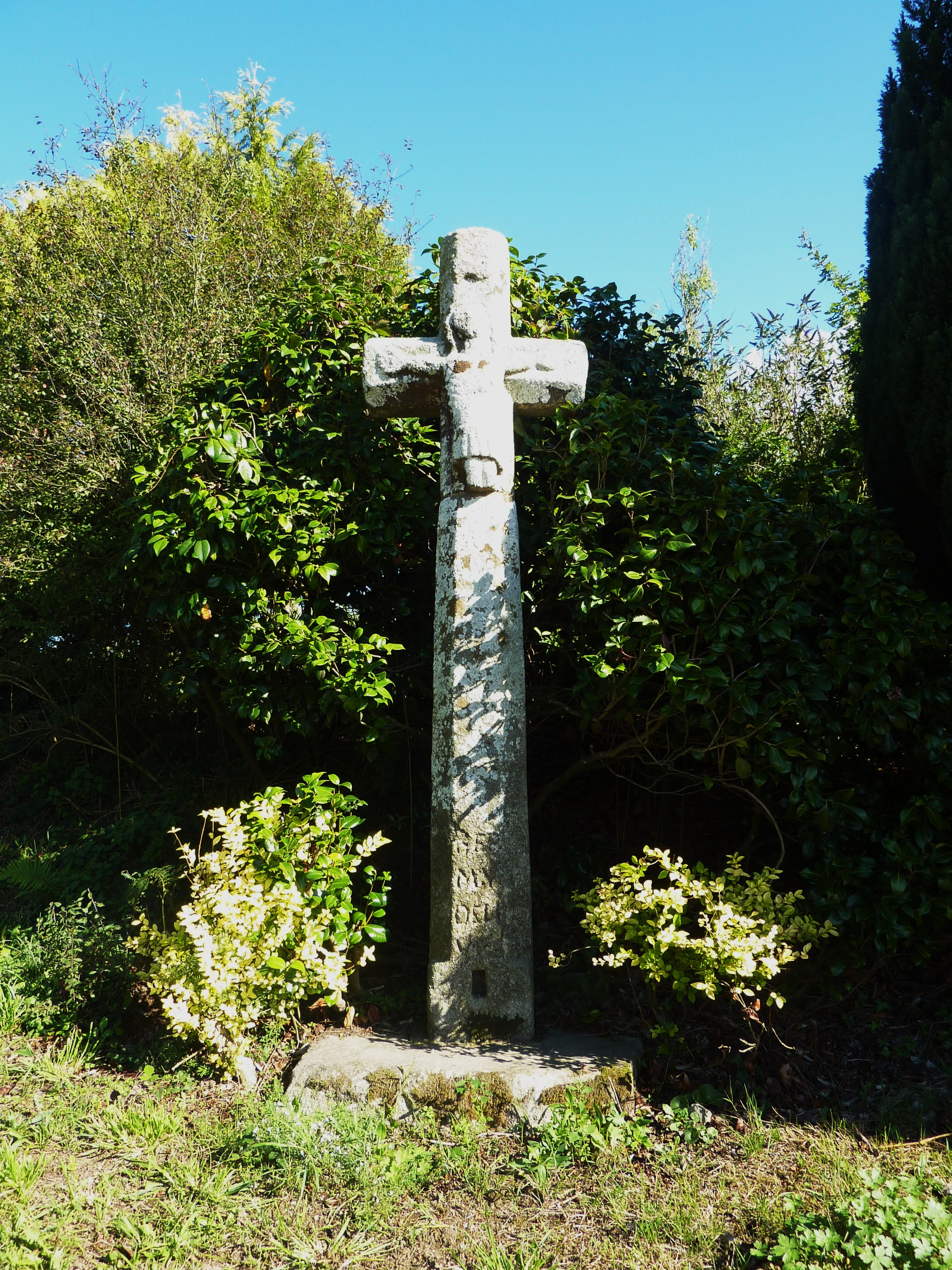
The calvary at Névez, which inspired the cross in The Green Christ

Gauguin created this work while living in Pont-Aven, Brittany. Topographically, the site depicted is the Atlantic coast at Le Pouldu. But the calvary depicted is an amalgam of several calvaries from different places; the cross is based upon that in the centre of Névez, a community close to Pont-Aven, located several miles from the coast, and the figure of Christ is based upon the calvarie at Briec, also at some distance from the sea. The Breton people, known for their strong Catholic faith and adherence to traditional customs, inspired Gauguin’s portrayal of their authentic spirituality in The Green Christ.

== Composition & style ==
The Green Christ depicts a Breton woman kneeling at the foot of a green crucifix. This woman wears traditional, modest Breton clothing and holds a black lamb in her left hand. The statue of Christ, shown after the crucifixion, has an elongated, motionless body supported by the three Marys, whose expressions are somber.

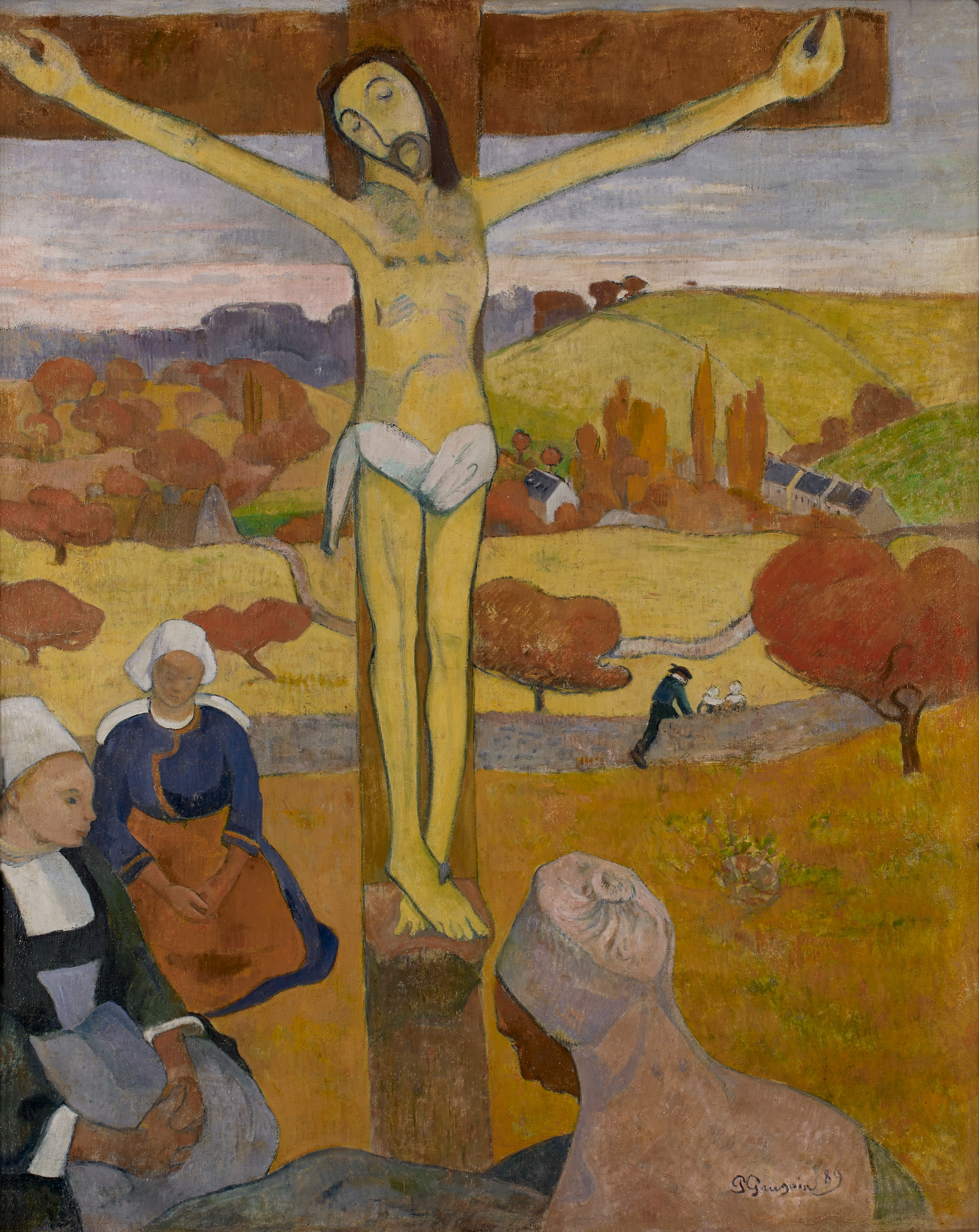
Paul Gauguin, The Yellow Christ, 1886.

== Interpretation & symbolism ==
Rather than striving for realism, Gauguin sought to convey emotionally the condition of human suffering through non-naturalistic form and color.

== Other works ==
- List of paintings by Paul Gauguin
