= Landscape with Peacocks (Death) =

Painting by Paul Gauguin

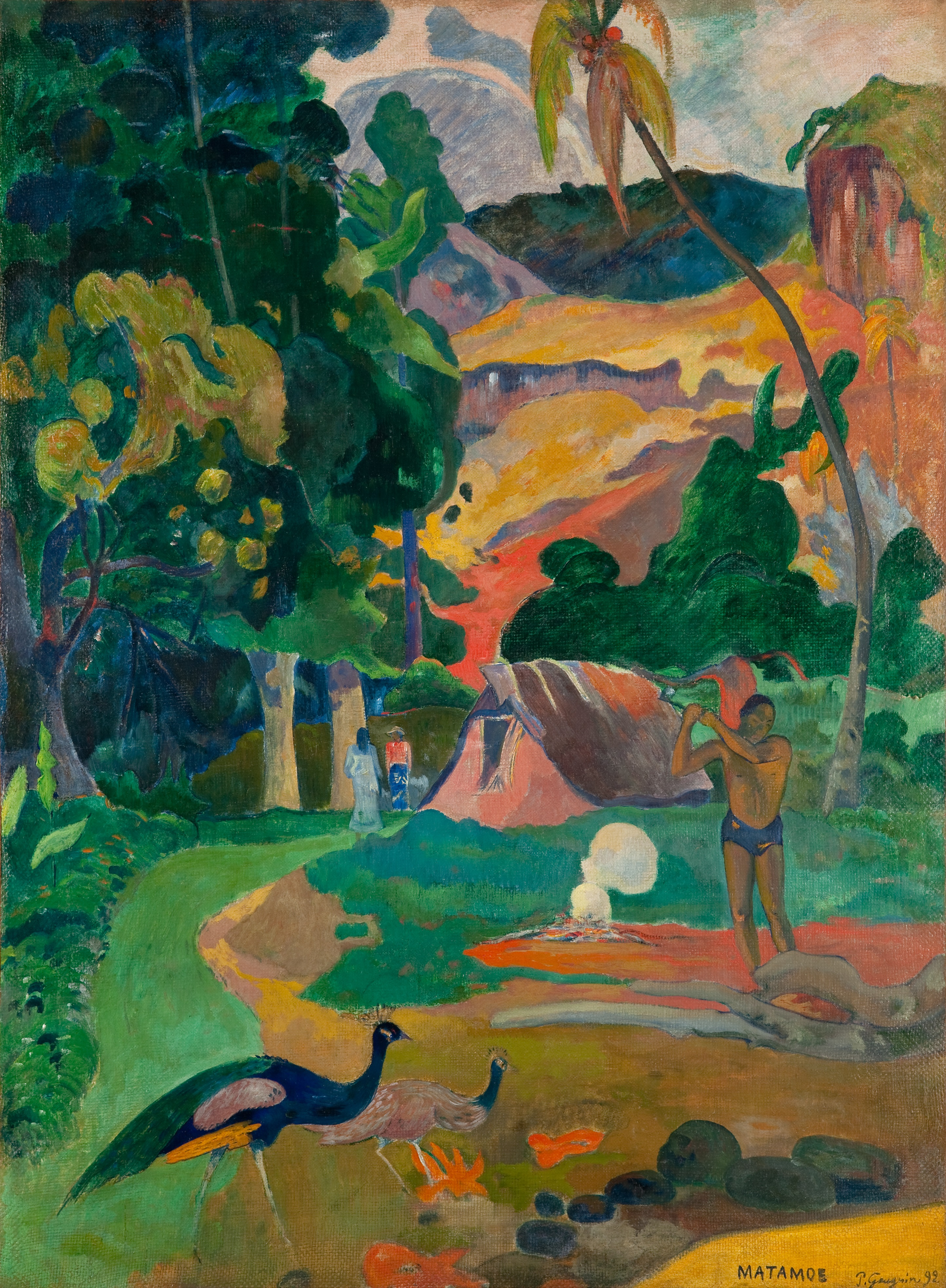
- Artist: Paul Gauguin
- Year: 1892
- Type: Oil paint on canvas
- Dimensions: 115 by 86 centimetres (45 in × 34 in)
- Location: Pushkin Museum, Moscow

Landscape with Peacocks (Death) (French - Le paysage aux paons (La mort)) is an oil on canvas painting by Paul Gauguin, from 1892. It is held in the Pushkin Museum, in Moscow.

== History ==
By the time he painted the work, Gauguin had moved from Papeete to settle in the village of Mataiea on the south side of Tahiti. He also gave it the Tahitian title Matamoe, whose meaning is heavily debated - it has sometimes been translated as "In the old days", "Once", "Wanderers" or "Strangers", and sometimes as death, hence the subtitle in Gauguin's own French title for the work in his 1893 catalogue of his works sold at Paul Durand-Ruel. His Arii Matamoe from the same year is usually translated as "Death of the King".

It returns to the same subject as the earlier Tahitian with an Axe (1891, private collection), whose male figure is almost identical to the Moscow work. A. V. Petukhov, senior researcher at the Pushkin Museum, believes that this image was borrowed by Gauguin from the Parthenon Frieze, photographs of which Gauguin took with him to Tahiti, whereas Bengt Danielsson believes the model was Gaston Pia, a Tahitian school janitor from the village of Paea, 21 kilometres from Papeete. A preparatory drawing for this figure in ink, pencil and gouache survives in the Art Institute of Chicago.

The artist sent the work to Paul Durand-Ruel in 1893 and it was exhibited at the Hotel Drouot sale of Gauguin's drawings and paintings in Paris on 18 February 1895, intended to finance another trip to Tahiti, at which A. Seguin bought it for 480 francs. It was in Ambroise Vollard's gallery in 1906 and on 4 May 1907 it and Conversation were bought for a total of 15,000 francs by Ivan Morozov. His collection was seized by the Soviet state after the October Revolution and from 1923 to 1948 was assigned to the State Museum of Modern Western Art before being moved to its current home.

== See also ==
- List of paintings by Paul Gauguin
