= The Bunch of Flowers (Gauguin) =

Painting by Paul Gauguin

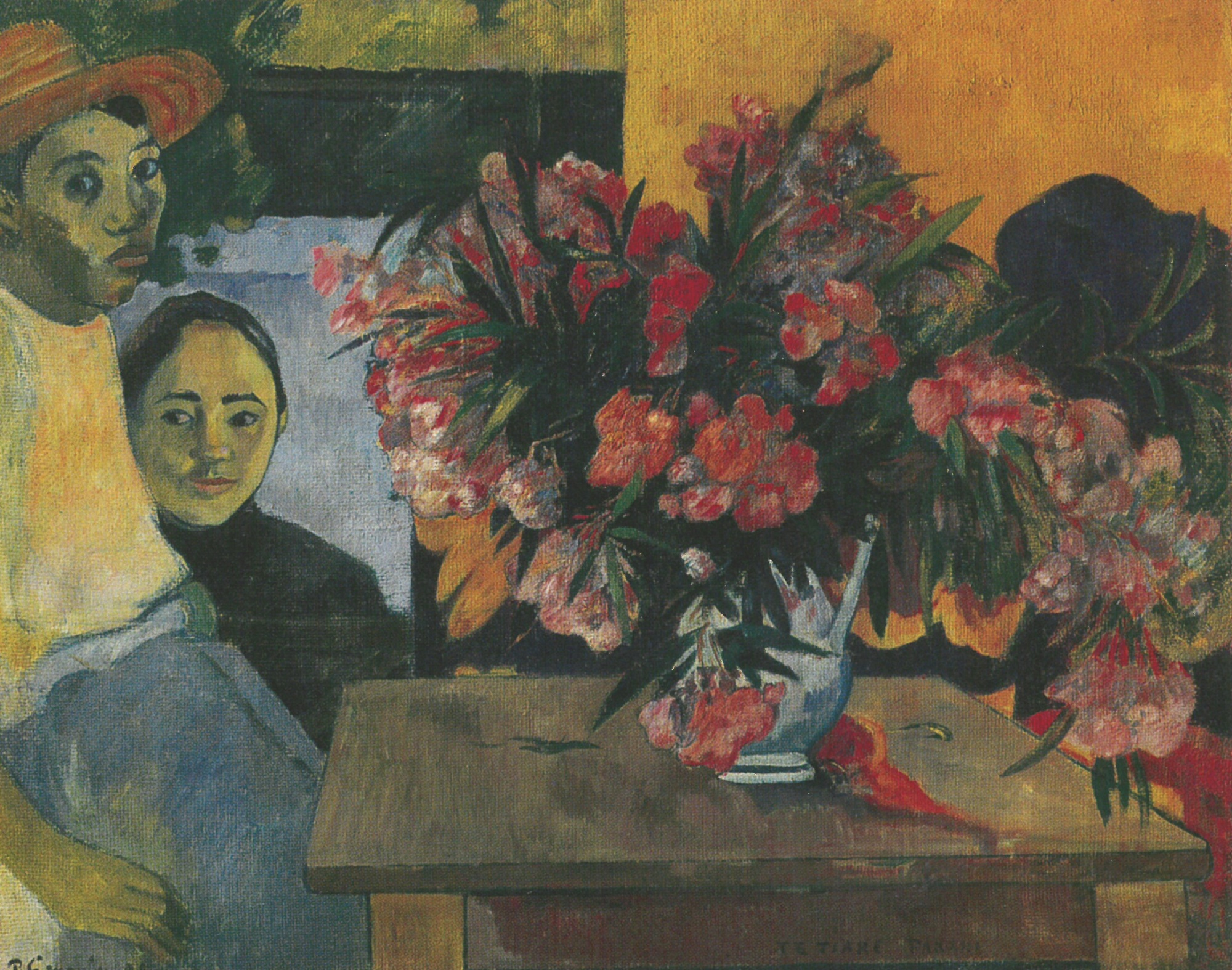
- Artist: Paul Gauguin
- Year: 1891
- Medium: oil on canvas
- Dimensions: 72 cm × 92 cm (28 in × 36 in)
- Location: Pushkin Museum; Moscow

The Bunch of Flowers or Flowers of France (French: Le bouquet de fleurs [lə bukɛ d(ə) flœʁ]; Tahitian: Te tiare farani) is an oil on canvas painting by Paul Gauguin, from 1891. It is held in the Pushkin Museum in Moscow. It was one of the first in his series of Tahitian works.

== History ==
The work was the second (after Tahitian Woman with a Flower) Gauguin gave a Tahitian title, in this case shown on the table-top to the right of centre. Under the vase is a map with the outlines of South America, while a young Tahitian man sits to the left of the image while a girl in a dark dress looks out of a window behind him. The artist sent the work to Paris in 1893, where it was first exhibited to the public in Paul Durand-Ruel's gallery - it was given its French title at this time. On 18 February 1895 it was exhibited at a sale of Gauguin's drawings and paintings at the Hotel Drouot auction house, with the money raised intended to finance another trip to Tahiti by the artist.

The painting did not sell and Gauguin bought it back for 340 francs. The work was then put on sale at Ambroise Vollard's gallery, where it was exhibited at the 1906 Autumn Salon. Ivan Morozov bought the work in 1908 for 8,000 francs - Vollard claimed to Morozov that Hugo von Tschudi had previously offered to buy the work for the Alte Nationalgalerie in Berlin and the deal only fell through because of von Tschudi's resignation. The Soviet state seized Morozov's collection after the October Revolution and it was assigned to the State Museum of Modern Western Art in 1923. That museum was abolished in 1948 and the work transferred to its present home.

== See also ==
- List of paintings by Paul Gauguin
