= List of paintings by Paul Gauguin =

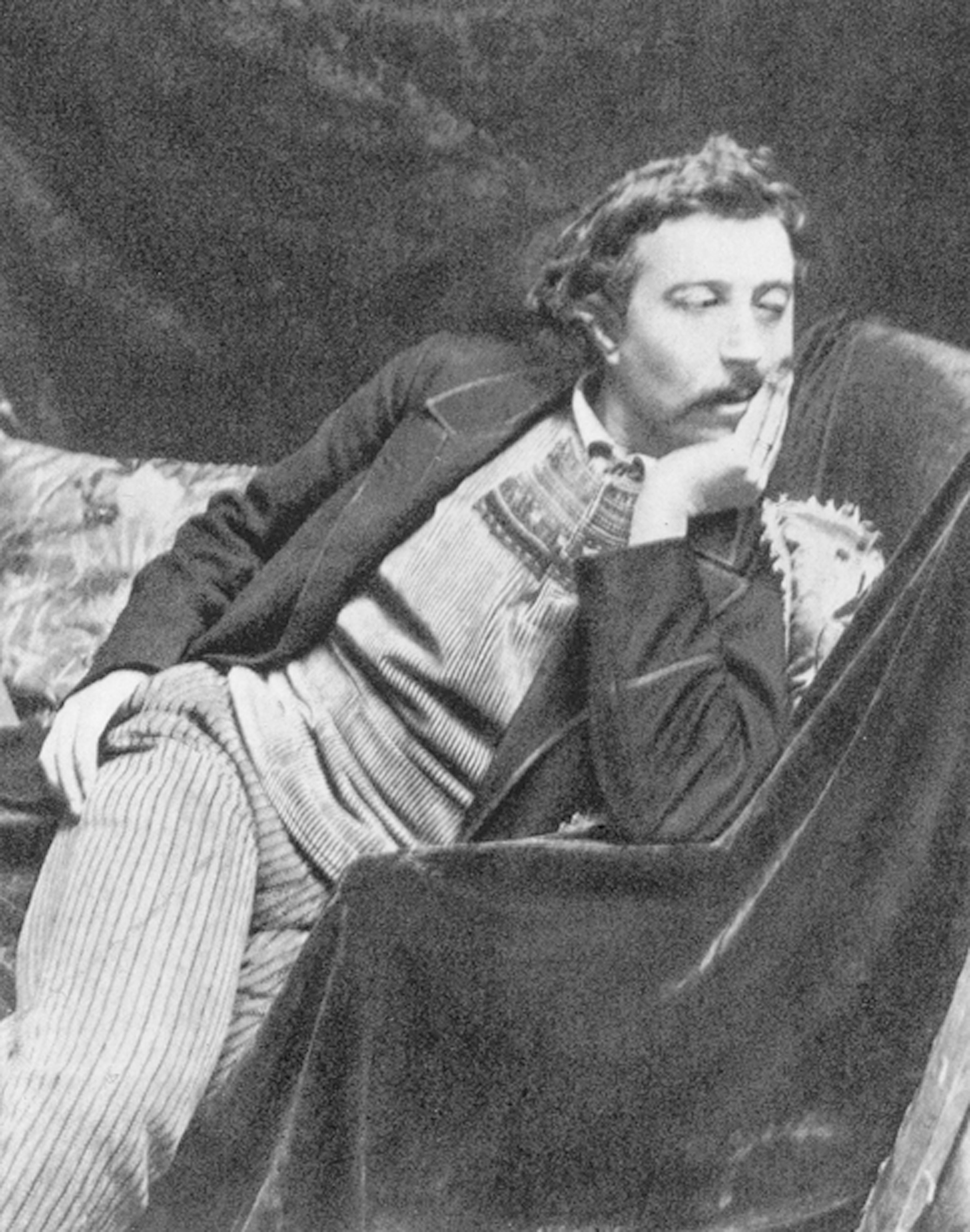
Paul Gauguin, 1891, unknown photographer

This is an incomplete list of paintings by the French painter Paul Gauguin.

== Overview ==
Paul Gauguin (1848–1903) was a leading 19th-century Post-Impressionist artist, painter, sculptor, printmaker, ceramist and writer. His bold experimentation with color directly influenced modern art in the 20th century while his expression of the inherent meaning of the subjects in his paintings, under the influence of the cloisonnist style, paved the way to Primitivism and the return to the pastoral. He was also an influential proponent of wood engraving and woodcuts as art forms.

== Timeline ==
- 1873–1884 Family life in Paris
- 1884 Family life in Rouen
- 1884 Family life in Copenhagen
- 1885 Dieppe, Paris
- 1886–1887 Artist's colony, Pont Aven, Brittany
- 1887 Trip to Martinique
- 1888 Pont Aven
- 1888 Staying with Van Gogh in Arles, Provençal
- 1889 Pont Aven
- 1891–1893 Trip to Tahiti
- 1894 Pont Aven
- 1895–1901 Living in Tahiti
- 1901–1903 Living at Hiva Oa, Marquesas Islands

== List ==
- Titles in French and English were not necessarily given by Gauguin. Titles in Tahitian are those written on the paintings. Click on the image for more information about the painting.
- Column Catalogue number (Cat. no.) indicates the Wildenstein Index Number (W. Georges/Daniel) and/or the Gabriele Mandel Sugana Index Number (S.)

=== 1873–1885 (Paris, Rouen, Copenhagen) ===
Gauguin's paintings from the period 1873–1885, by year
Image	Title	Year	Location	Dimensions (cm.)	Cat. no. Medium
	Path in the Forest	1873	Private collection		W. 4/5
	Travaux des champs dans la plaine, ou Le Lac dans la plaine	1873	Fitzwilliam Museum, Cambridge, Massachusetts		W. 5/4
	Still life with Open Book	1874–1878	Private collection		W. 3
	Maisons au bord de l'eau	1874	Ny Carlsberg Glyptotek, Copenhagen		W. 6/8
		1874 (ca)			W. 7
	Clearing II	1874	Private collection		W. 8/7
	Landscape with Poplars	1875	Indianapolis Museum of Art		W. 11/13
	Landscape from Viroflay	1875	Ny Carlsberg Glyptotek		W. 12/14
	River Seine seen From Iéna Bridge	1875	Musée d'Orsay, Paris		W. 13/12
	Pont roulant au bord de la Seine, ou La Seine à Paris entre le pont d'Iéna et le pont de Grenelle	1875	National Museum of Modern and Contemporary Art, Seoul		W. 14/20; S. 4
	The Seine at Pont de Grenelle	1875	Wallraf-Richartz Museum, Cologne		W. 15/18
	Mette Asleep on a Sofa	1875			W. 96/22
	Pears and Grapes	1876 (ca)	Private collection		W. 2/26
	Flowers in a Vase with a Musical Score	1876	Private collection		W. 9/36
	Seascape	1876			W. 17
	Daisies and Peonies in a Blue Vase	1876	Private collection		W. 19/35; S. 5
	Jacinthe et pommes sur un journal	1876	Private collection		W. 19bis/41
	Bouquet de pivoines sur une partition, ou Vase de fleurs sur une page de musique	1876	Deji Art Museum, Nanjing		W. 20/34
	Nature morte aux huîtres	1876	Virginia Museum of Fine Arts, Richmond		W. 21/32
	Autumn Landscape	1877	Private collection		W. 1/38
	Portrait of Claude-Antoine-Charles Favre	1877	Private collection		W. 22/43
	Ingeborg Thaulow	1877	Private collection		W. 23/44
	Self portrait	1875–1877 (ca)	Fogg Museum, Cambridge, Massachusetts		W. 25
	Mette Gauguin	1878	Foundation E.G. Bührle, Zürich		W. 26
	Still life with Fish	1878 (ca)	Gothenburg Museum of Art		W. 28/27
	Apple Trees at l'Hermitage III	1879	Philadelphia Museum of Art		W. 31/52
	Apple Trees at l'Hermitage II	1879	Aargauer Kunsthaus, Aarau		W. 33/51
	Haystacks	1879	Private collection		W. 34/48
	Village path	1879	Private collection		W. 35/53
	The Market Gardens of Vaugirard	1879	Smith College Museum of Art, Northampton		W. 36/55
	Garden under snow	1879	Szépművészeti Múzeum, Budapest		W. 37/57
	Jardin sous la neige II ou La neige a Vaugirard I	1879	Ny Carlsberg Glyptotek, Copenhagen		W. 38/58
	Riverside	1879	Private collection		W. 38bis/54
	Portrait of a Man	1880	Dallas Museum of Art		W. 29
	Vaugirard Church	1880	Groninger Museum, Netherlands		W. 30/69
	Study of a Nude (Suzanne sewing)	1880	Ny Carlsberg Glyptotek, Copenhagen		W. 39
	In the Henhouse	1878 (ca)	Thyssen-Bornemisza Museum		W. 40
	Houses at Vaugirard	1880	Israel Museum, Jerusalem		W. 44/58
	Mandolin on a chair	1880	Menard Art Museum, Komaki, Japan		W. 46/63
	Wood Tankard and Metal Pitcher	1880	Art Institute of Chicago		W. 47/60
	Flowers and Carpet (Pansies)	1880	Private collection		W. 48/61
	The Makings of a Bouquet	1880	Private collection		W. 49/62
	L'Intérieur, rue Carcel; ou Intérieur du peintre Paris, rue Carcel	1881	National Gallery of Norway		W. 50/76
	Interior with Aline	1881	Millennium Gallery, Sheffield		W. 51/77
	The little one sleeping	1881	Ordrupgaard, near Copenhagen		W. 52 & 54/75
	Little Girl Playing, or Pond with Ducks	1881	Private collection		W. 55/74
	Vase of Flowers	1881(ca)	Musée des Beaux-Arts de Rennes		W. 63
	La famille du peintre au jardin, rue Carcel	1881	Ny Carlsberg Glyptotek, Copenhagen		W. 67
	Still Life with Oranges	1882	Musée des Beaux-Arts de Rennes		W. 65/59
	The Quarries of Le Chou near Pontoise	1882	National Gallery of Canada, Ottawa		W. 71/86
	Blue Barge	1882	Lowe Art Museum, Miami		W. 73/90
	Flowers and Books	1882	Private collection		W. 77/96
	Still Life with Flowers	1882	Ny Carlsberg Glyptotek		W. 78/95
	Portrait of a Woman (Ingeborg Thaulow)	1883 (ca)	Private collection		W. 41/109
	La neige, Rue Carcel	1883	Ny Carlsberg Glyptotek		W. 75/97
	Aline Gauguin and One of Her Brothers	1883	Private collection		W. 82/111
	Osny, rue de Pontoise, Winter	1883	Private collection		W. 84/99 oil on mahogany panel
	La Groue Farm, Osny	1883	Private collection		W. 85/103
	Busagny Farm, Osny	1883	Rhode Island School of Design Museum, Providence		W. 86/101
	Osny, Stormy Weather	1883	Ny Carlsberg Glyptotek		W. 87/102
	Poplar-lined Lane, Osny	1883	Ny Carlsberg Glyptotek		W. 88/105
	The Stream, Osny	1883	Private collection		W. 89/100
	Tomatoes and a Pewter Tankard on a Table	1883	Private collection		W. 90/107
	Dahlias and Mandolin	1883	Private collection		W. 91/108
	Clovis asleep	1884	Private collection		W. 81/151; S. 12
Room with view from an open window	Chambre avec vue d’une fenêtre ouverte	ca. 1884	Private collection, Switzerland	double-sided painting	
	Mlle S. Manthey	1884	Kröller-Müller Museum, Otterlo, Netherlands		W. 97/152
	Portrait of a Man	1884	Private collection		W. 94/153; S. 13
	Madame Mette Gauguin in Evening Dress	1884	National Gallery, Oslo		W. 95/154
	Snow in Copenhagen	1884	Private collection		W. 88/160
	Blue Roofs of Rouen	1884	Am Römerholz, Winterthur		W. 100/116
	Un Coin de jardin à Rouen, ou Vue d'un jardin, Rouen	1884	Portland Museum of Art		
	Notre-Dame-des-Anges, Rouen	1884	Private collection		W. 102/130
	Rouen, L'Eglise Saint-Ouen	1884	Private collection		W. 103/124
	Young Woman Lying in the Grass	1884	Private collection		W. 104/137
	Three Cows	1884	Kunstmuseum Winterthur		W. 106/131
	Cow in the Meadow	1884	Private collection		W. 107/138
	Forest Interior	1884	Museum of Fine Arts, Boston		W. 110/135; S. 16
	Street in Rouen	1884	Thyssen-Bornemisza Museum, Madrid		W. 111/122
	Sunken Lane	1884	Private collection		W. 111(bis)/128
	Meadow and Trees	1884	Private collection		W. 114/133
	The Hillside	1884	Private collection		W. 115/126
	The Road	1884	Foundation E.G. Bührle, Zurich		W. 117/127
	Vue générale de Rouen	1884	Private collection		W. 118/123
	French Landscape, Fan Project	1884	Ny Carlsberg Glyptotek		W. 119
	Cliffs at La Bouille	1884	Private collection		W. 120/143
	Entrance to the Village of Osny	1884	Museum of Fine Arts, Boston		W. 121/106
	The Seine at Rouen	1884	Private collection		W. 122/142
	Manuring, or Return from the Harvest	1884	Wallraf–Richartz Museum, Cologne		W. 124/117
	The Pond	1884	Private collection		W. 125/121
	Rue du Nord, Rouen	1884	Private collection		W. 126/114
	Rue Jouvenet in Rouen	1884	Museo Thyssen-Bornemisza, Madrid		W. 127/115
	Still Life with Peonies	1884	National Gallery of Art, Washington, DC		W. 131/145; S. 18
	Apples, Jug, Iridescent Glass	1884	Private collection		W. 133/134
	Nasturtiums and Dahlias in a Basket	1884	National Gallery (Norway), Oslo		W. 134/150
	Portrait du peintre Granchi-Taylor	1885	Kunstmuseum Basel		W. 136/205
	Portrait of Philibert Favre	1885	Private collection		W. 137/206
	Gauguin devant son chevalet	1885	Kimbell Art Museum, Fort Worth		W. 138/165
	Fan Design, Garden under Snow	1885	Fitzwilliam Museum, Cambridge, England		W. 140/162
	The Queen's Mill, Copenhagen	1885	Ny Carlsberg Glyptotek		W. 141/174
	Østervold Park, Copenhagen	1885	Kelvingrove Art Gallery and Museum, Glasgow		W. 142/173
	Winter's End, Copenhagen; or Winter Landscape in Copenhagen	1885	Private collection		W. 143/167
	Conversation	1884	Private collection		W. 144/175
	(in English) French Landscape after Cézanne	1885	Ny Carlsberg Glyptotek		W. 147
	Skaters in Frederiksberg Gardens	1884	Ny Carlsberg Glyptotek		W. 148/161
	Tree-Lined Road, Rouen II	1885	Ny Carlsberg Glyptotek		W. 149/163

=== 1885–1886 (Dieppe, Paris) ===
Gauguin's paintings from the period 1885–1886, by year
Image	Title	Year	Location	Dimensions (cm.)	Cat. no. Medium
	Lane in the Beech Stand	1885	Aargauer Kunsthaus, Aarau		W. 150/198
	Forest Edge	1885	Private collection		W. 151/197
	The edge of the forest (III)	1885	Kröller-Müller Museum, Otterlo		W. 152/199; S. 21
	Boy by the Water	1885	Private collection		W.153/196
	Père Jean's Path	1885	Mohamed Mahmoud Khalil Museum, Giza		W. 155/195
	The Willows	1885	Private collection		W. 156/200
	Cow and horse in a meadow	1885	Private collection		W. 157/190
	Cows at the Watering Place	1885	Galleria d'Arte Moderna, Milan		W. 158/192
	Watering Trough	1885	Private collection		W. 159/203
	Cows resting	1885	Museum Boijmans Van Beuningen, Rotterdam		W. 160/191
	Geese in the Meadow	1885	Portland Museum of Art		W. 161/184
	Stable near Dieppe II	1885	Private collection		W. 162/189
	Stable near Dieppe I	1885	Private collection		W. 163/188
	À Sèvres	1885	Private collection		W. 164/214; S. 23
	La Maison blanche / Le Château de l’Anglaise	1885	Private collection		W. 165/183
	Coast at Dieppe	1885	Private collection		W. 166/178
	Women Bathing	1885	National Museum of Western Art, Tokyo		W. 167/179
	Schooner and Three-Master	1885	Private collection		W. 168/212
	Harbour Scene, Dieppe	1885	Manchester Art Gallery		W. 169/180
	By the Stream, Autumn	1885	Private collection		W. 171/204
	Bare Trees	1885	Private collection		W. 172/186
	Still Life with Chinese Peonies and Mandoline	1885	Musée d'Orsay, Paris		W. 173/169
	Still Life with Carafon and Figurine	1885	Private collection		W. 174/171
	Dahlias in a Copper Vase	1885	Private collection		W. 175/201
	Still life with interior	1885	Private collection		W. 176/164
	Lilacs	1885	Thyssen-Bornemisza Museum, Madrid		W. 177/168
	Deux vases de fleurs et un éventail	1885	Private collection		W. 178/170; S. 25
	Evening Primroses in a Vase	1885	Private collection		W. 181/202
	L'Abreuvoir I	1885	Private collection		W. 191/194; S. 34
	Still Life with Moss Roses in a Basket	1886	Philadelphia Museum of Art		W. 182/148
	Still Life with Horses Head	1886	Bridgestone Museum of Art, Tokyo		W. 183/216
	La femme au chignon	1886	Bridgestone Museum of Art, Tokyo		W. 184; S. 28
	The boss's daughter	1886	Musée du Prieuré, Saint-Germain-en-Laye		W. 186/207; S. 30
	Portrait of the artist's son	1886	Portland Museum of Art		W. 187/208; S. 31
	Suburb under Snow	1886	Private collection		W. 188/210; S. 32
	Fire at the Riverbank	1886	Thyssen-Bornemisza Museum, Madrid		W. 193/211

=== 1886–1891 (Brittany, Martinique, Provençal) ===
Gauguin's paintings from the period 1886–1891, by year
Image	Title	Year	Location	Dimensions (cm.)	Cat. no. Medium
	Farm in Brittany II	1886	Private collection		W. 194/231; S.43
	Mount Sainte-Marguerite seen from the vicinity of the presbytery	1886	Private collection		W. 195/227; S. 44
	Washer-women at Pont-Aven	1886	Musée d'Orsay, Paris		W. 196/224; S. 45
	Mother and Child under a Tree at Pont-Aven	1886	Pola Museum of Art, Kanagawa		W. 197/222; S. 40
	Bathing in front of the Port at Port-Aven	1886	Dixon Gallery and Gardens, Memphis		W. 198/223; S. 42
	Lollichon Field and Pont-Aven Church	1886	Private collection		W. 199/225; S. 46
	The Field of Derout-Lollichon	1886	Los Angeles County Museum of Art		W. 200/226; S. 47
	Four Breton Women dancing	1886	Neue Pinakothek, Munich		W. 201/237; S. 54
	The Breton Shepherdess	1886	Laing Art Gallery and Museum, Newcastle upon Tyne		W. 203/233; S. 48
	Seascape	1886	Gothenburg Museum of Art		W. 205/235; S. 50
	Cowherd, Bellangenet Beach	1886	Private collection		W. 206/234; S. 51
	Rocks and Sea	1886	Private collection		W. 206 bis/236 S. 52
	Still Life with Profile of Laval	1886	Indianapolis Museum of Art		W. 207/238; S. 39
	Pots et Bouquets	1886	Private collection		W. 209/239; S. 37
	The White Bowl	1886	Kunsthaus Zürich		W. 211; S. 36
	Breton Boys Bathing (The Bathing by the Mill in Bois d’Amour, Pont-Aven)	1886	Hiroshima Museum of Art		W. 272/221; S. 103
	Two Bathers	1887	Museo Nacional de Bellas Artes (Buenos Aires)		W. 215/241
	By the Seashore, Martinique	1887	Ny Carlsberg Glyptotek, Copenhagen		W. 217/242; S. 57
	Still Life with a Sketch after Delacroix	c. 1887	Strasbourg Museum of Modern and Contemporary Art		W. 533/257; S. 355
	By the Seashore, Martinique II	1887	Private collection		W. 218/253; S. 58
	Women and Goat in the Village	1887	Israel Museum, Jerusalem		W. 219; S. 6
	Near the Huts	1887	Private collection		W. 221/249; S. 64
	(in French) Au bord de la rivière (in English) On the Banks of the River at Martinique	1887	Van Gogh Museum, Amsterdam		W. 222/252; S. 65
	Fruit Picking or Among the Mangoes	1887	Van Gogh Museum, Amsterdam		W. 224/250; S. 67
	Comings and Goings, Martinique	1887	Thyssen-Bornemisza Museum, Madrid		W. 245
	Stream under the Trees	1887	Neue Pinakothek, Munich		W. 226/246; S. 59
	Conversation	1887	Private collection		W. 227/251; S. 68
	Huts under the Trees	1887	Private collection		W. 230/244; S. 71
	Palm Trees on Martinique	1888	Private collection		W. 231/243; S. 72
	Végétation tropicale, Martinique	1888	National Gallery of Scotland, Edinburgh		W. 232/248; S. 61
	The Washer-girl	1888	Private collection		W. 234/255; S. 60
	Still Life with Mangoes and a Hibiscus Flower	1888	Museum of Fine Arts, Houston		W. 238/256; S. 56
	Self-portrait with Portrait of Bernard	1888	Van Gogh Museum, Amsterdam		W. 239/309
	Portrait of Madeleine Bernard	1888	Museum of Grenoble		W. 240/305; S. 130
	Le Capitaine Jacob	1888	Private collection		W. 241/306; S. 128
	Girl in front of Open Window	1888	Private collection		W. 242/292; S. 129
	Portrait of a Pont-Aven Woman	1888	Private collection		W. 244/293; S. 85
	Vision After the Sermon	1888	National Gallery of Scotland, Edinburgh		W. 245/308; S. 88
	Blue Tree Trunks, Arles	1888	Ordrupgaard, Copenhagen		W. 246(311)/319; S. 88(134)
	Pont-Aven under Snow	1888	Konstmuseum Gothenburg		W. 248/264; S. 75
	Printemps à Lézaven, ou Les Premières Fleurs	1888	Private collection		W. 249/279
	Conversation in the fields. Pont-Aven	1888	Royal Museums of Fine Arts of Belgium		W. 250/280; S. 76
	Breton Girls Dancing, Pont-Aven	1888	National Gallery of Art, Washington, DC		W. 251/296; S. 89
	Breton Women at the Turning	1888	Ny Carlsberg Glyptotek		W. 252/271; S. 90
	Autumn at Pont-Aven or The Aven Running through Pont-Aven	1888	Private collection		W. 253/313; S. 91
	Breton Woman with Pitcher	1888	Private collection		W. 254/267; S. 92
	The Swineherd	1888	Los Angeles County Museum of Art		W. 255/302; S. 79
	Landscape of Brittany	1888	National Museum of Western Art, Tokyo		W. 256/265; S. 78
	Landscape from Pont-Aven, Brittany	1888	Ny Carlsberg Glyptotek		W. 258/273
	A Meadow on the Banks of the Aven	1888	Pushkin Museum, Moscow		W. 260/269; S. 82
	L'Aven en contre bas de la Montagne Sainte-Marguerite	1888	Bridgestone Museum of Art, Tokyo		W. 261/268; S. 81
	Breton Fishermen	1888	Private collection		W. 262/275; S. 94
	The White River	1888	Museum of Grenoble		W. 263/285; S. 95 (on reverse of W. 240)
	Fisherman and bathers on the Aven	1888	Private collection		W. 264/300; S. 96
	Dogs Running in a Meadow	1888	Thyssen-Bornemisza Museum		W. 265/282; S. 97
	Cove opposite Pont-Aven Harbour	1888	Private collection		W. 266/276; S. 98
	Path down to the Aven	1888	Ordrupgaard, Denmark		W. 268/278
	Haymaking in Brittany	1888	Musée d'Orsay, Paris		W. 269/287; S. 101
	A Landscape at Pont Aven	1888	Barber Institute of Fine Arts, Birmingham		W. 271; S. 102
	Young Wrestlers	1888	Private collection		W. 273/298; S. 104
	Children Wrestling	1888	Private collection		W. 274/299; S. 105
	Breton Boys Bathing	1888	Kunsthalle, Hamburg		W. 275/297; S. 106
	Turkeys at Pont-Aven	1888	Private collection		W. 276/283; S. 83
	Geese Games	1888	Private collection		W. 277/274; S. 107
	Breton Woman and Goose by the Water	1888	Private collection		W. 278/307; S. 108
	Cow Lying at the Foot of a Tree, or Kneeling Cow	1888	Private collection		W. 279/284; S. 109
	The Clog Maker	1888	Musée des Beaux Arts de Pont-Aven		W. 280/286; S. 111
	Seascape with cow	1888	Musée d'Orsay, Paris		W. 282/310; S. 113
	The Creek	1888	Private collection		W. 284/289; S. 116
	Rocks on the Coast	1888	Musée des Beaux Arts de Pont-Aven		W. 285/288; S. 117
	The Wave	1888	Private collection		W. 286/303; S. 118
	Still Life with Japanese Print	1888	Private collection		W. 287/260; S. 119
	Still Life with Fruits	1888	Pushkin Museum, Moscow		W. 288/312; S. 120
	La Fête Gloanec	1888	Musée des Beaux-Arts d'Orléans		W. 290/301; S. 122
	Apples and Bowl	1888	Private Collection		W. 291/261; S. 123
	Bouquet of Flowers Against the Sea	1888	Musée d'Orsay, Paris		W. 292/262; S. 124
	Still Life with Three Puppies	1888	Museum of Modern Art, New York		W. 293/311; S. 127
	Little Cat	1888	Private collection		W. 294/321; S. 126
	The Painter of Sunflowers	1888	Van Gogh Museum, Amsterdam		W. 296/326; S. 133
	Self-portrait	1888 (ca)	Pushkin Museum, Moscow		W. 297; S. 132
	Portrait of Madame Roulin	1888	Saint Louis Art Museum		W. 298/327; S. 146
	Arlésiennes (Mistral)	1888	Art Institute of Chicago		W. 300/329; S. 144
	Woman with pigs (In the full heat of the day)	1888	Private collection		W. 301/320; S. 143
	Washerwomen at the Roubine du Roi, Arles	1888	Museum of Modern Art, New York		W. 302/322; S. 140
	Les laveuses à Arles II	1888	Bilbao Fine Arts Museum		W. 303/325; S. 141
	Vendanges à Arles, ou Misères humaines	1888	Ordrupgaard, Copenhagen		W. 304/317; S. 142
	The Night Café in Arles	1888	Pushkin Museum, Moscow		W. 305/318; S. 145
	Lane at Alchamps, Arles	1888	Seiji Togo Memorial Yasuda Kasai Museum of Art, Tokyo		W. 306/316; S. 137
	Les Alyscamps, ou Les Trois grâces au temple de Venus	1888	Musée d'Orsay, Paris		W. 307/314; S. 138
	Landscape near Arles	1888	Indianapolis Museum of Art		W. 308/315; S. 139
	Landscape from Arles	1888	Nationalmuseum, Stockholm		W. 309/323; S. 136
	Arles landscape with bushes	1888	Private collection		W. 310/324; S. 135
	Blue Tree Trunks, Arles	1888	Ordrupgaard, Copenhagen		W. 311(246)/319; S. 134(88)
	Schuffenecker's Studio	1889	Musée d'Orsay, Paris		W. 313; S. 148
	Madame Alexandre Kohler	1888 or 1889	National Gallery of Art, Washington, DC		W. 314/258; S. 155
	La Belle Angèle	1889	Musée d'Orsay, Paris		W. 315; S. 156
	Young Breton Woman	1889	Private collection		W. 316; S. 157
	Meyer de Haan	1889	Museum of Modern Art, New York		W. 317; S. 200
	Mimi and her Cat	1890	Private collection		W. 319
	Nirvana, Portrait of Jacob Meyer de Haan	1889 or 1890	Wadsworth Atheneum, Hartford		W. 320; S. 198
	Bonjour Monsieur Gauguin (I), ou Bonjour Monsieur Gauguins (sic)	1889	Hammer Museum, Los Angeles		W. 321; S. 195
	Bonjour Monsieur Gauguin (II)	1889	National Gallery in Prague		W. 322; S. 196
	Self-Portrait with Halo	1889	National Gallery of Art, Washington, DC		W. 323; S. 199
	Self-portrait with Mandolin	1889	Private collection		W. 325; S. 153
	Christ in the Garden of Olives	1889	Norton Museum of Art, West Palm Beach		W. 326; S. 149
	The Yellow Christ	1889	Albright-Knox Art Gallery, Buffalo		W. 327; S. 151
	The Green Christ	1889	Royal Museums of Fine Arts of Belgium		W. 328; S. 150
	Breton Girl Spinning	1889	Van Gogh Museum, Amsterdam		W. 329; S. 191
	Caribbean Woman	1889	Private collection		W. 330; S. 194
	The Artist with the Yellow Christ	1890–1891	Musée d'Orsay, Paris		W. 324; S. 152
	Breton Eve I	1889	McNay Art Museum, San Antonio		W. 333
	Breton Eve II	1889	Private collection		W. 334
	Life and Death	1889	Mohamed Mahmoud Khalil Museum, Giza		W. 335; S. 159
	In the Waves	1889	Cleveland Museum of Art		W. 336; S. 158
	Woman in the Waves	1889	Private collection		W. 337
	Breton Boy	1889	Wallraf-Richartz Museum, Cologne		W. 339; S. 160
	Two Breton Girls by the Sea	1889	National Museum of Western Art, Tokyo		W. 340; S. 189
	Little Breton Girls by the Sea	1889	Private collection		W. 341
	The Milkmaid	1889	Private collection		W. 343
	Seated Breton Girl	1889	Ny Carlsberg Glyptotek, Copenhagen		W. 344; S. 161
	Little Girls at Pouldu	1889	Private collection		W. 345; S. 190
	Breton Childhood	1889	Fukushima Prefectural Museum of Art		W. 346
	Autumn in Brittany (The Willow Tree)	1889	Nelson-Atkins Museum of Art, Kansas City		W. 347; S. 166
	Seaweed Gatherers	1889	Museum Folkwang, Essen		W. 349; S. 180
	Haymakers	1889	Private collection		W. 350; S. 163
	Golden Harvest	1889	Musée d'Orsay, Paris		W. 351; S. 164
	Haystack	1889	Courtauld Institute Galleries, London		W. 352; S. 162
	The Gate	1889	Kunsthaus Zürich		W. 353; S. 169
	Girl Herding Pigs	1889	Private collection		W. 354; S. 172
	Fields by the Sea	1889	Nationalmuseum, Stockholm		W. 356; S. 171
	Landscape, Bretagne	1889	National Gallery (Norway), Oslo		W. 357; S. 167
	Dressmaking	1889	Private collection		W. 358; S. 170
	On the Beach	1889	National Gallery (Norway), Oslo		W. 359; S. 183
	Above the Sea	1889	Private collection		W. 360; S. 177
	The Flageolet Player on the Cliff	1889	Indianapolis Museum of Art		W. 361; S. 178
	Beach at Le Pouldu	1889	Private collection		W. 362; S. 184
	The coast at Bellangenay	1889	Springfield Museum of Art, Ohio		W. 363; S. 185
	The Isolated House	1889	Private collection		W. 364; S. 179
	The Red Cow	1889	Los Angeles County Museum of Art		W. 365; S. 174
	Breton boy with Goose	1889	Pierre Rosenberg, Paris		W. 367; S. 168
	Vue sur Pont-Aven prise de Lezaven	1889	Private collection		W. 370/281
	View Of The Beach At Bellangenay	1889	Private collection		W. 371; S. 186
	Still Life with Head-Shaped Vase and Japanese Woodcut	1889	Tehran Museum of Contemporary Art		W. 375; S. 203
	Still life (in pointillism style)	1889	Private collection		W. 376; S. 204
	Still Life with Fan	1888	Musée d'Orsay, Paria		W. 377/259; S. 201
	Fruits on a table with a small dog	1889	Private collection (Stolen 1970 but recovered. In the custody of the Carabinieri)		W. 378; S. 210
	The Ham	1889	Phillips Memorial Gallery, Washington, DC		W. 379; S. 209
	Still Life with Onions	1889	Ny Carlsberg Glyptotek, Copenhagen		W. 380; S. 202
	Still Life with Peaches	1889	Fogg Art Museum, Cambridge, Massachusetts		W. 381; S. 206
	Fruits in a bowl	1889	Private collection		W. 381bis/215 S. 207
	Still Life in a Bowl	1889	Virginia Museum of Fine Arts, Richmond		W. 382; S. 208
	The Goose	1889	Musée des Beaux-Arts de Quimper		W. 383; S. 192
	Self-Portrait Dedicated to Carrière	1888 or 1889	National Gallery of Art, Washington, DC		W. 384/291; S. 224
	The Artist's Mother	1889	Staatsgalerie Stuttgart		W. 385; S. 225
	Portrait of the Painter Slewinski	1890	National Museum of Western Art, Tokyo		W. 386; S. 221
	Woman in Front of a Still Life by Cézanne	1890	Art Institute of Chicago		W. 387; S. 223
	Loulou	1890	The Barnes Foundation, Philadelphia		W. 388; S. 222
	Exotic Eve	1890	Pola Museum of Art, Kanagawa		W. 389; S. 226
	Paradise Lost	c. 1890	Yale University Art Gallery, New Haven		W. 390; S. 227
	The Seaweed Gatherers	1889 or 1890	Private collection		W. 392
	Houses in Le Pouldu	1890	Staatliche Kunsthalle Karlsruhe		W. 393; S. 235
	Farm at Le Pouldu	1890	Private collection		W. 394; S. 234
	House at Pan-du	1890	Private collection		W. 395; S. 231
	Seaside Harvest: Le Pouldu	1890	National Gallery, London		W. 396; S. 230
	Haystacks in Brittany	1890	National Gallery of Art, Washington, DC		W. 397; S. 228
	Landscape at Le Pouldu	1890	National Gallery of Art, Washington D.C.		W. 398; S. 233
	Landscape at Pouldu	1890	Musée des beaux-arts de La Chaux-de-Fonds		W. 399; S. 232
	Still Life with Apples, a Pear, and a Ceramic Portrait Jug	1889	Fogg Art Museum, Cambridge, Massachusetts		W. 405; S. 215
	Double portrait d'enfants	1889 or 1895	Ny Carlsberg Glyptotek		W. 530; S. 354
	Oranges and Lemons with View of Pont-Aven	1890	Museum Langmatt, Baden		W. 401; S. 213
	Bowl of Fruit and Tankard before a Window	1890	National Gallery, London		W. 402; S. 214
	Fruit Dish on a Garden Chair	1890	Los Angeles County Museum of Art		W. 404; S. 211
	Self Portrait with Palette	1891 or 1893	Private collection		W. 410; S. 238
	The Loss of Virginity	1890 or 1891	Chrysler Museum of Art, Norfolk		W. 412; S. 236
	Olympia, after Manet	1891	Private collection		W. 413; S. 237
	Portrait of the Artist with the Idol	1893 (ca)	McNay Art Museum, San Antonio		W. 415; S. 239

=== 1891–1893 (Tahiti, Brittany) ===
Gauguin's paintings from the period 1891–1893, by year
Image	Title	Year	Location	Dimensions (cm.)	Cat. no. Medium
	Creole Child	1891	Private collection		W. 416; S. 245
	Young Creole	1891	Musée d'art moderne de Troyes		W. 417; S. 248
	Le capitaine Swaton	1891	Metropolitan Museum of Art, New York		W. 419; S. 247
	Vahine no te tiare	1891	Ny Carlsberg Glyptotek, Copenhagen		W. 420; S. 243
	Head of Tahitian Woman	1891	Private collection		W. 421; S. 242
	Young Man with Flower	1891	Private collection		W. 422; S. 241
	Portrait of Suzanne Bambridge	1891	Royal Museums of Fine Arts of Belgium		W. 423; S. 244
	Faaturuma	1891	Nelson-Atkins Museum of Art, Kansas City		W. 424; S. 272
	Tahitian Woman	1894 (ca)	Brooklyn Museum, New York		W. 424 bis
	Te tiare farani	1891	Pushkin Museum, Moscow		W. 426; S. 251
	The Meal (The Bananas)	1891	Musée d'Orsay, Paris		W. 427; S. 249
	Ia Orana Maria	1891	Metropolitan Museum of Art, New York		W. 428; S. 263
	Tahitian Fisherwomen	1891	Alte Nationalgalerie, Berlin		W. 429; S. 268
	A Man with an Axe	1891	Private collection		W. 430; S. 265
	Raro te oviri (I)	1891	Dallas Museum of Art		W. 431; S. 267
	I raro te Oviri (II)	1891	Minneapolis Institute of Art		W. 432; S. 266
	Upa upa	1891	Israel Museum, Jerusalem		W. 433; S. 253
	Tahitian Women on the Beach	1891	Musée d'Orsay, Paris		W. 434; S. 270
	Parau Parau	1891	Hermitage Museum, St Petersburg		W. 435; S. 252
	Te fare māori	1891	Private collection		W. 436; S. 257
	Te raau rahi I	1891	Cleveland Museum of Art		W. 437; S. 255
	Te raau rahi (III)	1891	Art Institute of Chicago		W. 439; S. 254
	Te Faaturuma	1891	Worcester Art Museum, Massachusetts		W. 440; S. 271
	Rue de Tahiti	1891	Toledo Museum of Art, Ohio		W. 441; S. 261
	Tahitian Landscape	1891	Metropolitan Museum of Art, New York		W. 442; S. 262
	In the Vanilla Grove, Man and Horse	1891	Solomon R. Guggenheim Museum, New York		W. 443; S. 258
	Women near the Palm Trees	1891	Private collection		W. 444; S. 264
	Landscape with Black Pigs and a Crouching Tahitian	1891	Private collection		W. 445; S. 269
	The Black pigs	1891	Hungarian National Gallery	W. 446; S. 260	
	Haere Mai	1891	Solomon R. Guggenheim Museum, New York		W. 447; S. 259
	Head of a Tahitian Woman	1892	Private collection		W. 448; S. 275
	Vahine no te vi	1892	Baltimore Museum of Art		W. 449; S. 274
	Vairumati tei Oa	1892	Pushkin Museum, Moscow		W. 450; S. 284
	Te aa no areois	1892	Museum of Modern Art, New York		W. 451; S. 283
	Atiti	1892	Kröller-Müller Museum, Otterlo		W. 452; S. 273
	Arii Matamoe	1892	J. Paul Getty Museum, Los Angeles		W. 453
	When will you marry?	1892	Kunstmuseum Basel		W. 454; S. 276
	Te nave nave fenua	1892	Ohara Museum of Art, Kurashiki		W. 455; S. 286
	Two Nudes on a Tahitian Beach	1892	Honolulu Museum of Art		W. 456; S. 280
	Spirit of the Dead Watching	1892	Albright-Knox Art Gallery, Buffalo		W. 457; S. 282
	Parau na te Varua ino	1892	National Gallery of Art, Washington, DC		W. 458
	Barbarous Tales	1892	Private collection		W. 459; S. 278
	Aha Oe Feii?	1892	Pushkin Museum, Moscow		W. 461; S. 287
	Tahitian Women Bathing	1892	Metropolitan Museum of Art, New York City		W. 462; S. 288
	Fatata te miti	1892	National Gallery of Art, Washington, DC		W. 463; S. 291
	Haere Pape	1892	The Barnes Foundation, Merion		W. 464; S. 289
	Vahine no te miti	1892	Museo Nacional de Bellas Artes (Buenos Aires)		W. 465
	Parau api	1892	Galerie Neue Meister, Dresden		W. 466; S. 292
	Mata Mua	1892	Museo Thyssen-Bornemisza, Madrid		W. 467; S. 311
	Arearea	1892	Musée d'Orsay, Paris		W. 468; S. 312
	Arearea II	1892	Museum of Fine Arts, Houston		W. 469
	Tahitian Pastoral	1892	Hermitage Museum, St Petersburg		W. 470; S.313
	The Three Huts	1892	Pola Museum of Art, Kanagawa		W. 471; S. 307
	Parau Parau	1892	Yale University Art Gallery, New Haven		W. 472; S. 298
	Taperaa mahana	1892	Hermitage Museum, St Petersburg		W. 473; S. 297
	Ta Matete	1892	Kunstmuseum Basel		W. 476; S. 314
	Te Fare Hymenee	1892	Private collection		W. 477
	E Haere oe i Hia	1892	Staatsgalerie Stuttgart		W. 478; S. 315
	Parahi te marae	1892	Fogg Museum, Harvard University		Study for W. 483
	Parahi te marae	1892	Philadelphia Museum of Art		W. 483; S. 318
	Matamoe	1892	Pushkin Museum, Moscow		W. 484; S. 308
	Te poipoi	1892	Private collection		W. 485; S. 309
	Te burao	1892	Art Institute of Chicago		W. 486; S. 306
	Mahana maa (I)	1892	Cincinnati Art Museum		W. 490; S. 304
	Mahana maa (II)	1892	Finnish National Gallery		W. 491; S. 305
	Landscape With Blue Tree Trunks	1892	Private collection		
	Nue tahitienne assise avec fleur rouge	1892	Private collection, Switzerland	double-sided	
	Merahi metua no Tehamana	1893	Art Institute of Chicago		W. 497; S. 322
	Pape moea	1893	Musée d'Orsay, Paris		W. 498; S. 328
	Hina tefatou	1893	Museum of Modern Art, New York		W. 499; S. 329
	Hina Maruru	1893	Private collection		W. 500; S. 326
	Ea haere ia oe (A haere ia oe)	1893	Hermitage Museum, St Petersburg		W. 501; S. 321
	(in Tahitian) Otahi (in French) Seule (in English) Alone	1893	Private collection		W. 502; S. 327
	Tahitian Women near a River	1883	Private collection		W. 503; S. 325
	Tahitian Landscape	1893	Minneapolis Institute of Arts		W. 504; S. 323
	Apatarao	1893	Ny Carlsberg Glyptotek, Copenhagen		W. 505; S. 324
	Self-Portrait in a Hat	1893	Musée d'Orsay, Paris		W. 506; S. 332
	Portrait of William Molard	1893	Musée d'Orsay, Paris		W. 507; S. 331 (on reverse of W. 506)
	Aita Parari te Tamari Vahine Judith	1893 or 1894	Private Collection		W. 508; S. 330
	Rupe Tahiti (oil on glass)	1893	New Orleans Museum of Art		W. 509; S. 335
	Tahitienne dans un paysage (mural)	1893	Musée d'Orsay, Paris		W. 511; S. 333
	Nave nave moe	1894	Hermitage Museum, St Petersburg		W. 512; S. 337
	Mahana no atu	1894	Art Institute of Chicago		W. 513; S. 336
	Arearea no varua ino	1894	Private collection		W. 514; S. 329
	The Siesta	1894 (ca)	Metropolitan Museum of Art, New York City		W. 515; S. 340
	Portrait of Upaupa Schneklud	1894	Baltimore Museum of Art		W. 517; S. 341
	Praying Breton Girl / Young Christian Girl	1894	Sterling and Francine Clark Art Institute, Williamstown		W. 518; S. 342
	Christmas Night (The Blessing of the Oxen)	1894 (ca)	Indianapolis Museum of Art		W. 519
	Breton Peasant Women	1894	Musée d'Orsay, Paris		W. 521
	Landscape in Le Pouldu	1894	Nelson-Atkins Museum of Art, Kansas City		W. 522; S. 344
	Village in the Snow	1894	Private collection		W. 524; S. 350
	Breton Village in the Snow	c.1894	Musée d'Orsay, Paris		W. 525; S. 351
	A Farm in Brittany	1894	Metropolitan Museum of Art, New York		W. 526; S. 346
	A Farm in Brittany II	1884	Private collection		W. 527; S. 345
	Landscape in Brittany. The David Mill	1894	Musée d'Orsay, Paris		W. 528; S. 347
	Paris in the Snow	1894	Van Gogh Museum, Amsterdam		W. 529; S. 352
	Two Children	1884	Ny Carlsberg Glyptotek, Copenhagen		W. 530; S. 354
	(in French) Enfant au bavoir (in English) Child with a Bib	1884	Private collection		W. 531; S. 353
	Self-portrait »près du Golgotha«	1896	Museu de Arte de São Paulo		W. 534; S. 377
	Portrait of jeune fille Vaite Goupil	1896	Ordrupgaard		W. 535; S. 376

=== 1896–1903 (Tahiti, Marquesas Islands) ===
Gauguin's paintings from the period 1896–1903, by year
Image	Title	Year	Location	Dimensions (cm.)	Cat. no. Medium
	Joseph and Potiphar's Wife	1896	Private collection		W. 536; S. 375
	Scene from Tahitian Life	1886	Hermitage Museum, St Petersburg		W. 537; S. 387
	Eiaha Ohipa	1896	Pushkin Museum, Moscow		W. 538; S. 374
	Three Tahitian Women	1896	Metropolitan Museum of Art, New York City		W. 539; S. 366
	Bé bé (Pēpe)	1896	Hermitage Museum, St Petersburg		W. 540; S. 370
	Te tamari no atua	1896	Neue Pinakothek, Munich		W. 541; S. 371
	Te Arii Vahine	1896	Pushkin Museum, Moscow		W. 542; S. 364
	Te arii vahine II	1896	Private collection		W. 543; S. 365
	Te Vaa	1896	Hermitage Museum, St Petersburg		W. 544; S. 363
	Poor Fisherman	1896	Museu de Arte de São Paulo		W. 545; S. 362
	Landscape of Te Vaa	1896	Musée des Beaux-Arts André Malraux, Le Havre		W. 546; S. 360
	Barbaric Poems	1896	Fogg Art Museum, Cambridge, Massachusetts		W. 547; S. 373
	Nave nave mahana	1896	Musée des Beaux-Arts de Lyon		W. 548; S. 368
	Head of Tahitial Woman	1896	Private collection		W. 549
	No te aha oe riri?	1896	Art Institute of Chicago		W. 550; S. 369
	La Barque	1896	Private collection		W. 551; S. 361
	Tahitian Woman Standing	1896	Private collection		W. 552; S. 362
	Vase of Flowers	1896	National Gallery, London		W. 553; S. 357
	Still Life with Teapot and Fruit	1896	Metropolitan Museum of Art, New York		W. 554; S. 358
	Still Life with Mangos	1896	Private collection		W. 555; S. 359
	Portrait de l'artiste (à l'ami Daniel)	1896	Musée d'Orsay, Paris		W. 556; S. 378
	Te rerioa	1897	Courtauld Institute Galleries, London		W. 557; S. 383
	Nevermore	1897	Courtauld Institute Galleries, London		W. 558; S. 380
	Vairumati	1897	Musée d'Orsay, Paris		W. 559; S. 379
	Tahitian Man With His Arms Raised	1897	Private collection		W. 560; S. 382
	Where Do We Come From? What Are We? Where Are We Going?	1897 or 1898	Museum of Fine Arts, Boston		W. 561; S. 381
	Tarari maruru	1897	Hermitage Museum, St Petersburg		W. 562; S. 385
	Te bourao II	1897-1898	Private collection		W. 563; S.386
	Bathers in Tahiti	1897	Barber Institute of Fine Arts, Birmingham		W. 564; S. 387
	Man Picking Fruit from a Tree	1897	Hermitage Museum, St Petersburg		W. 565; S. 384
	Te Pape Nave Nave	1898	National Gallery of Art, Washington, DC		W. 568; S. 391
	Faa Iheihe	1898	National Gallery, London		W. 569; S. 392
	Rave te hiti aamu	1898	Hermitage Museum, St Petersburg		W. 570; S. 394
	The White Horse	1898	Musée d'Orsay, Paris		W. 571; S. 395
	The Bathers	1898	National Gallery of Art, Washington, DC		W. 572; S. 393
	Three Tahitians	1897	Private collection, Paris		W. 573; S. 396
	Faiara	1898	Ny Carlsberg Glyptotek, Copenhagen		W. 575; S. 390
	Femme Tahitienne I	1898	Ordrupgaard, Copenhagen		W. 576; S. 398
	Femme Tahitienne II	1898	National Museum of Serbia, Belgrade		W. 577; S. 397
	Tahitian Woman and Boy	1899	Norton Simon Museum, Pasadena		W. 578; S. 400
	The Great Buddha (The Idol)	1899	Pushkin Museum, Moscow		W. 579
	The Last Supper	1899	Private collection		W. 580; S. 402
	Women on the Seashore (Motherhood I)	1899	Hermitage Museum, St Petersburg		W. 581; S. 404
	Maternité II	1899	Private collection		W. 582; S. 403
	Two Tahitian Women	1899	Metropolitan Museum of Art, New York		W. 583; S. 399
	Three Tahitian Women Against a Yellow Background	1899	Hermitage Museum, St Petersburg		W. 584; S. 406
	Rupe Rupe	1899	Pushkin Museum, Moscow		W. 585; S. 407
	Te avae no Maria	1899	Hermitage Museum, St Petersburg		W. 586; S. 405
	Te tiai na oe i te rata	1899	Private collection		W. 587; S. 408
	Landscape with a Horse	1899	Ny Carlsberg Glyptotek, Copenhagen		W. 588; S. 409
	The Horse on the Road	1899	Pushkin Museum, Moscow		W. 589; S. 410
	Tahitian Landscape	1899	Museum of Modern Art, New York		W. 590; S. 411
	Still Life	1899	Israel Museum, Jerusalem		W. 591; S. 415
	Still Life with Cats	1899	Ny Carlsberg Glyptotek, Copenhagen		W. 592; S. 413
	The Square Basket	1901	National Gallery of Norway, Oslo		W. 593; S. 412
	Still Life with Flowers	1901	Private collection		W. 594; S. 414
	Polynesian Woman with Children	1901	Art Institute of Chicago		W. 595; S. 423
	The Gold of their Bodies	1901	Musée d'Orsay, Paris		W. 596; S. 424
	The Flight or The Ford	1901	Hermitage Museum, St Petersburg		W. 597; S. 429
	Idyll in Tahiti	1901	Foundation E.G. Bührle, Zurich		W. 598; S. 425
	Landscape with Horses	1901	Private collection		W. 599; S. 427
	Landscape	1901	Musée de l'Orangerie, Paris		W. 600; S. 426
	Landscape with Three Figures	1901	Carnegie Museum of Art, Pittsburg		W. 601; S. 428
	Still Life with Sunflowers on an Armchair	1901	Foundation E.G. Bührle, Zurich		W. 602; S. 421
	Still Life with Sunflowers on an Armchair II	1901	Hermitage Museum, St Petersburg		W. 603; S. 422
	Still Life with Sunflowers	1901	Private collection		W. 604; S. 420
	Flowers in a Bowl	1901	Private collection		W. 605; S. 417
	Sunflowers and Mangoes	1901	Private collection		W. 606; S. 419
	Fruit and Knife	1901	Foundation E.G. Bührle, Zurich		W. 607; S. 413
	Delicious	1901	Private collection		W. 608; S. 418
	Young Girl With Fan	1902	Museum Folkwang, Essen		W. 609; S. 439
	Two Women	1901 or 1902	Metropolitan Museum of Art, New York		W. 610; S.434
	The Guitar Player	1900 (ca)	Private collection, London		W. 611; S. 436
	The Call	1902	Cleveland Museum of Art, Cleveland		W. 612; S. 440
	The Escape	1902	National Gallery Prague		W. 614; S. 437
	Le Sorcier d’Hiva Oa ou le Marquisien à la cape rouge	1902	Musée d'Art moderne de Liège		W. 616; S.442
	The Sister of Charity	1902	McNay Art Museum, San Antonio		W. 617; S. 446
	Walk by the Sea or Tahitian Family or Bathers	1902	Private collection		W. 618; S. 445
	Horsemen on the Beach	1902	Museum Folkwang, Essen		W. 619; S. 452
	Horsemen on the Beach II	1902	Private collection		W. 620; S. 453
	Nativité	1902	Private collection		W. 621; S. 447
	The Judgement of Paris	1902	National Gallery in Prague		W. 622; S. 444
	Composition with Figures and a Horse	1902	Nationalmuseum, Stockholm		W. 623; S. 451
	The Offering	1902	Foundation E.G. Bührle, Zurich		W. 624; S. 448
	Barbarous Tales	1902	Museum Folkwang, Essen		W. 625; S. 438
	Two Women	1902	Private collection		W. 626; S. 449
	Horseman in front of the Hut	1902	Private collection		W. 627; S. 450
	Adam and Eve	1902	Ordrupgaard, Copenhagen		W. 628; S. 441
	Still Life with Parrots	1902	Pushkin Museum of Fine Arts, Moscow		W. 629; S. 432
	Still Life with Parrots II	1902	Von der Heydt Museum, Wuppertal		W. 630; S. 433
	Still Life with Grapefruit	1902	Goulandris Museum of Contemporary Art, Athens		W. 631; S. 430
	Self-Portrait three-quarter profile	1903	Private collection		W. 633; S. 458
	Self-Portrait with Glasses	1902–1903	Kunstmuseum Basel, Switzerland		W. 634; S. 459
	The Invocation	1903	National Gallery of Art, Washington, DC		W. 635; S. 455
	Women and a White Horse	1903	Museum of Fine Arts, Boston		W. 636; S. 454
	Hiva Oa	1903	Ateneum, Helsinki		W. 637; S. 457
	Landscape with Dog	1903	Israel Museum, Jerusalem		W. 638; S. 456
	Tahitians on the Riverbank	?	Honolulu Academy of Arts		
