= La Belle Angèle =

Painting by Paul Gauguin

The Beautiful Angel
- Artist: Paul Gauguin
- Year: 1889
- Medium: oil on canvas
- Dimensions: 92 cm × 73 cm (36 in × 29 in)
- Location: Musée d'Orsay, Paris

La Belle Angèle (English: The Beautiful Angel) is an 1889 painting by Paul Gauguin, now in the Musée d'Orsay in Paris. Its title derives from a nickname for its subject, Marie-Angélique Satre (1868-1932). She was one of three famous innkeepers in Pont-Aven, where the work was produced. Its style is heavily influenced by the 'Japonism' then fashionable in Paris, particularly by a canvas by Hokusai.

== See also ==
- List of paintings by Paul Gauguin
