= Mette Asleep on a Sofa =

1875 oil painting

- Mette Gauguin dormant sur un canapé (French)
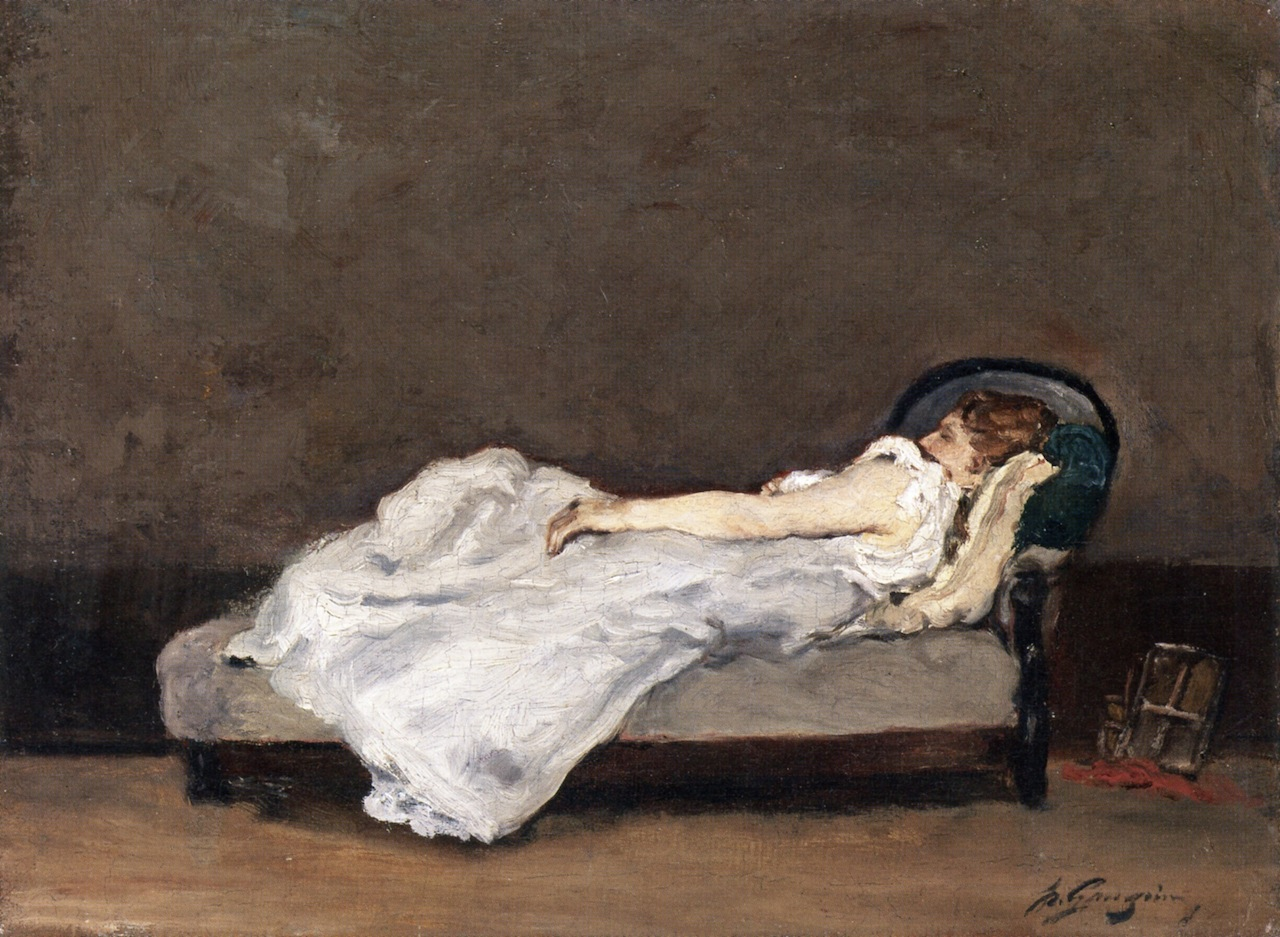
- Artist: Paul Gauguin
- Year: 1875
- Medium: Oil on canvas
- Dimensions: 24.4 cm × 32.7 cm (9.6 in × 12.9 in)
- Location: Private collection

Mette Asleep on a Sofa is an oil painting executed in 1875 by the French artist Paul Gauguin. The work depicts Gauguin’s wife, Mette Sophie Gad, reclining on a sofa in a Parisian interior and represents the artist’s early period prior to his involvement with Symbolism and non-European subjects.

== See also ==
- List of paintings by Paul Gauguin
