= Arearea =

Painting by Paul Gauguin

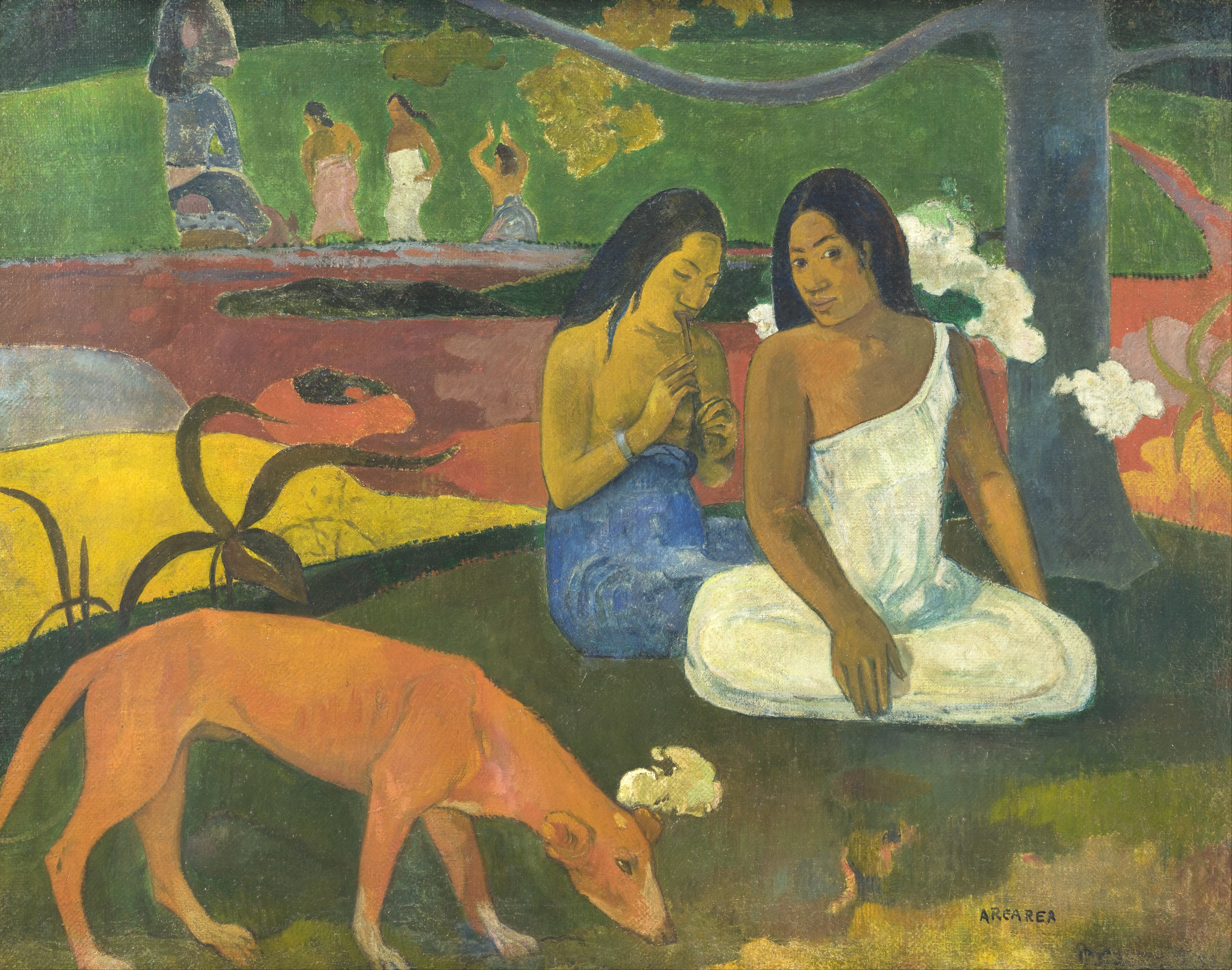
- Artist: Paul Gauguin
- Year: 1892
- Type: Oil paint on canvas
- Dimensions: 75 by 93 centimetres (30 in × 37 in)
- Location: Musée d'Orsay; Paris

Arearea is an 1892 work by French painter Paul Gauguin. It was one of the works Gauguin exhibited at his 1893 Durand-Ruel exhibition in Paris. It was bequeathed to the French state in 1961, and was in the collection of the Louvre. From 1986, the painting has been in the collection of the Musée d'Orsay. The prominence in his paintings of collarless free range dogs has been the subject of much speculation as to their symbolic or metaphorical meaning.

== See also ==
- List of paintings by Paul Gauguin
