= Portrait of Madame Roulin =

Painting by Paul Gauguin

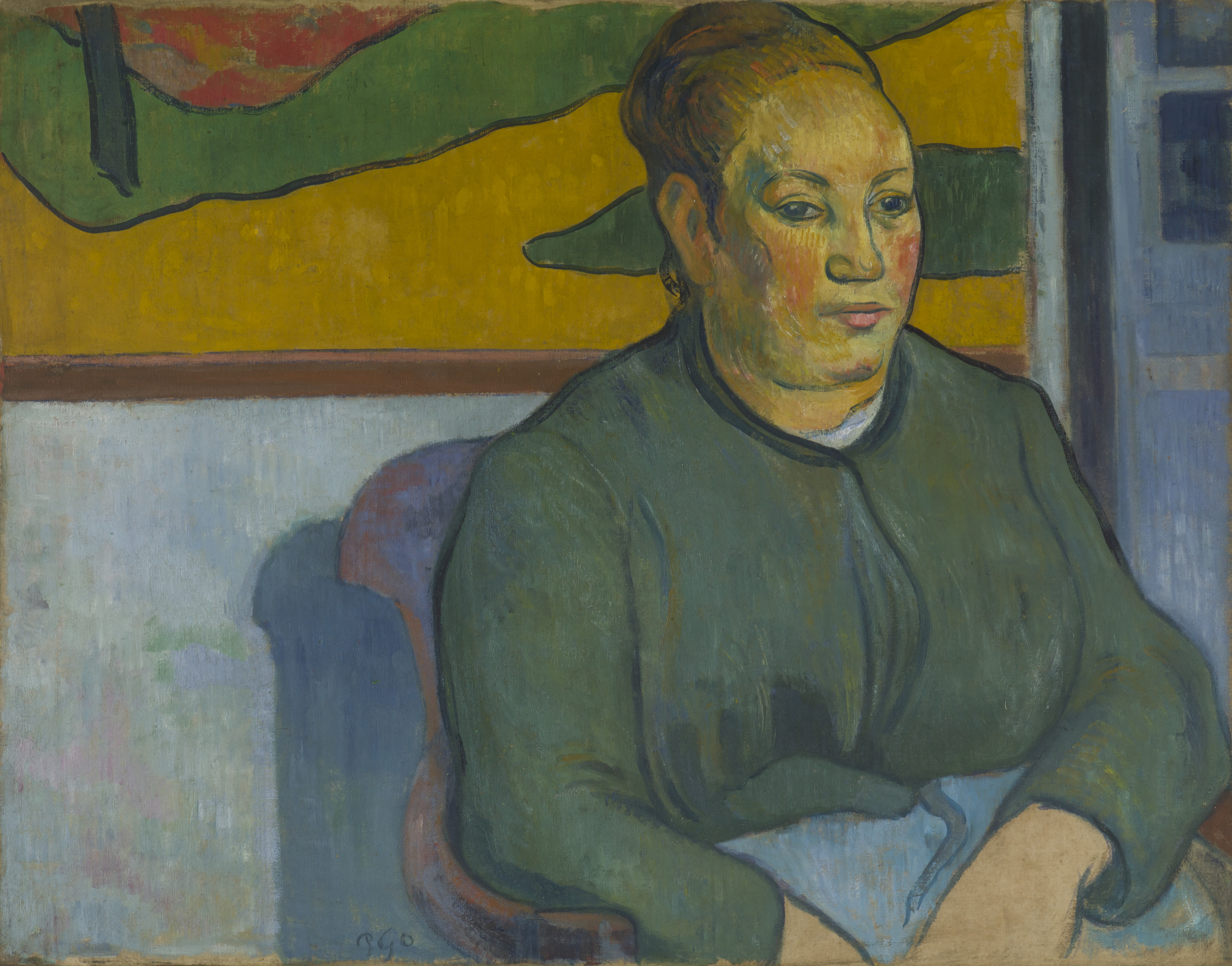
- Artist: Paul Gauguin
- Year: November 1888
- Medium: oil on canvas
- Dimensions: 50.5 cm × 63.5 cm (19.9 in × 25.0 in)
- Location: Saint Louis Art Museum, St Louis

Portrait of Madame Roulin is an oil on canvas portrait by Paul Gauguin of Augustine Roulin (née Pellicot; 1851-1930), wife of the postman Joseph Roulin (1841-1903). It is now in the St Louis Museum of Art.

It was painted at the end of November 1888 during Gauguin and Vincent van Gogh's joint stay in Arles, where the latter artist also painted the Roulin family.

== See also ==
- List of paintings by Paul Gauguin
