= Still Life with a Sketch after Delacroix =

Painting by Paul Gauguin

- Nature morte à l'esquisse de Delacroix (French)
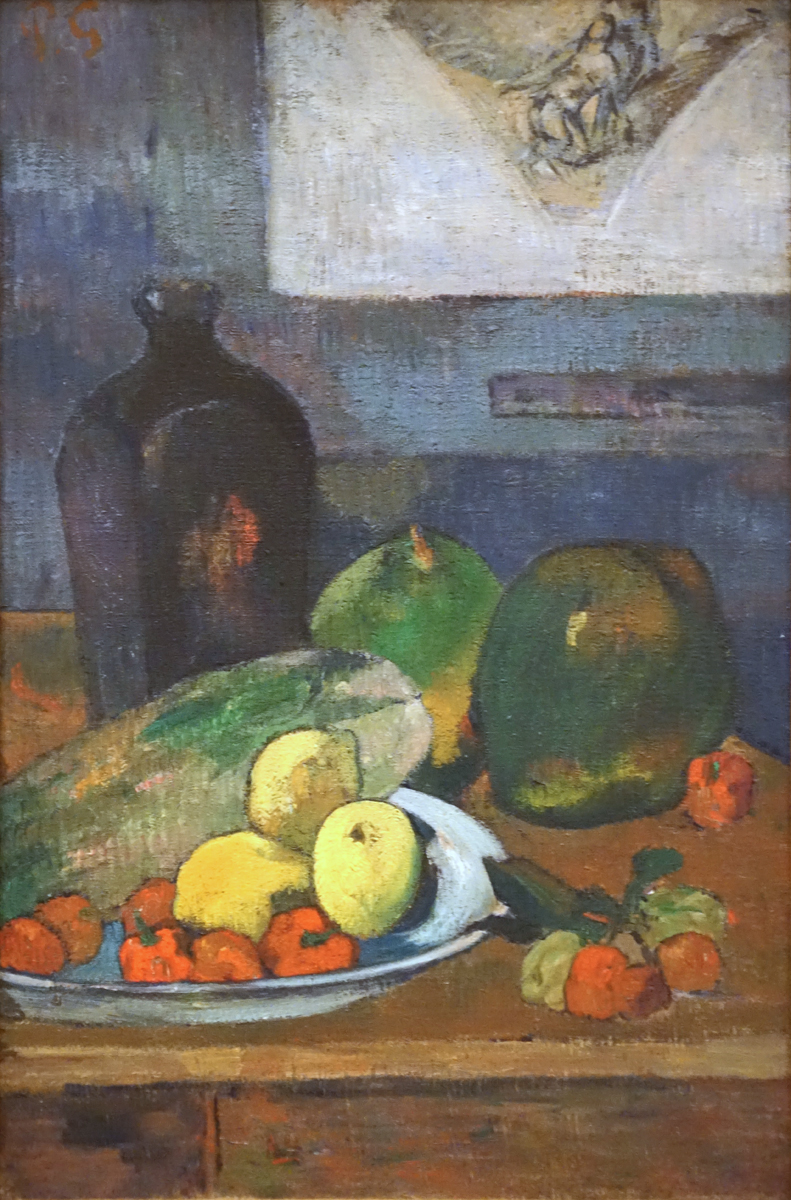
- Artist: Paul Gauguin
- Year: circa 1887
- Medium: oil painting on canvas
- Movement: Post-Impressionism
- Subject: still life sketch by Eugène Delacroix
- Dimensions: 45 cm × 30 cm (18 in × 12 in)
- Location: Musée d'Art moderne et contemporain, Strasbourg
- Accession: 1931

Still Life with a Sketch after Delacroix is an oil painting by the French artist Paul Gauguin. The undated work is thought to have been painted during the artist's 1887 stay in Martinique. It was bequeathed to the Strasbourg museum by Raymond Koechlin (of the Koechlin family) in 1931 and is now on display in the Musée d'Art moderne et contemporain. Its inventory number is 55.974.0.662.

The painting depicts a still life of exotic fruit and a large glass bottle on a wooden table. On the wall behind hangs an engraving after a sketch by Eugène Delacroix, depicting The Expulsion of Adam and Eve from Paradise. Gauguin's work thus represents the loss of a traditional Paradise and the gain of new one, represented by the generous nature of a far-away island.

== See also ==
- List of paintings by Paul Gauguin
