= Fruits on a Table =

1889 painting by Paul Gauguin

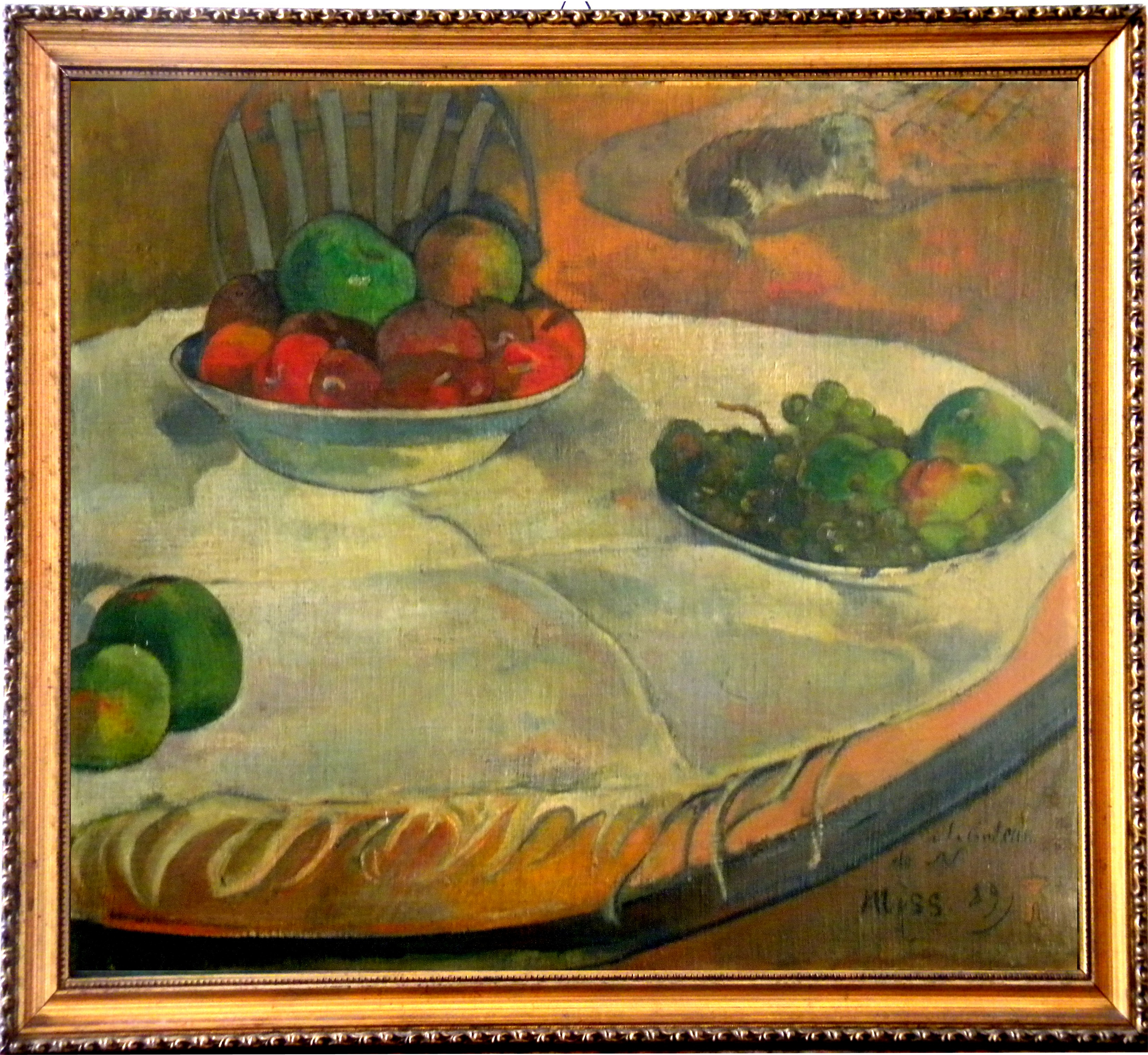
- Artist: Paul Gauguin
- Year: 1889
- Medium: oil on canvas
- Location: private collection

Fruits on a Table or Still Life with Apples and Grapes (Nature Morte a la Comptesse de N) is a still life painting by French artist Paul Gauguin painted in 1889. It was one of two works stolen from the private collection of Terence F. Kennedy in London in June 1970 and recovered by the Carabinieri in Italy in April 2014.

== Description ==
The painting depicts two bowls of brightly coloured apples and grapes, on a fringed white linen cloth, on a wooden table, with a small dog sleeping on the floor in the background. It is signed and dedicated "a la Comptesse De N (Nimal)".

== Provenance ==
The painting, along with Pierre Bonnard's Woman With Two Armchairs (La Femme Aux Deux Fauteuils), was stolen from the flat of widower Terence F. Kennedy (whose wife Mathilda died in 1964) at Chester Terrace, in Regent's Park on June 6, 1970. Press reports at the time said that Kennedy's housekeeper was duped by three men, one posing as a policeman and the others as burglar alarm engineers, and that they cut the paintings from their frames while she was making them tea. After the theft, the paintings are alleged to have been smuggled through France on the Paris-to-Turin train, and then to have turned up in the lost-and-found railway depot in Turin. It is said they were auctioned in 1975 and that a worker at the Fiat Factory bought the paintings for a small sum.

== Recovery ==
The paintings are said to have remained in the factory worker's kitchen until an art expert's evaluation in 2014. Once they were identified the Carabinieri took the paintings into custody. Under Italian law the factory worker could have a right to keep them if he could prove that he bought them in good faith. In December 2014 they were returned to him by a court in Rome. Simultaneously, the sole and universal heir of the original owner, Terence F. Kennedy, was found and has since made his claim to title.

== See also ==
- List of paintings by Paul Gauguin
