= Tahitian Woman and Boy =

Painting by Paul Gauguin

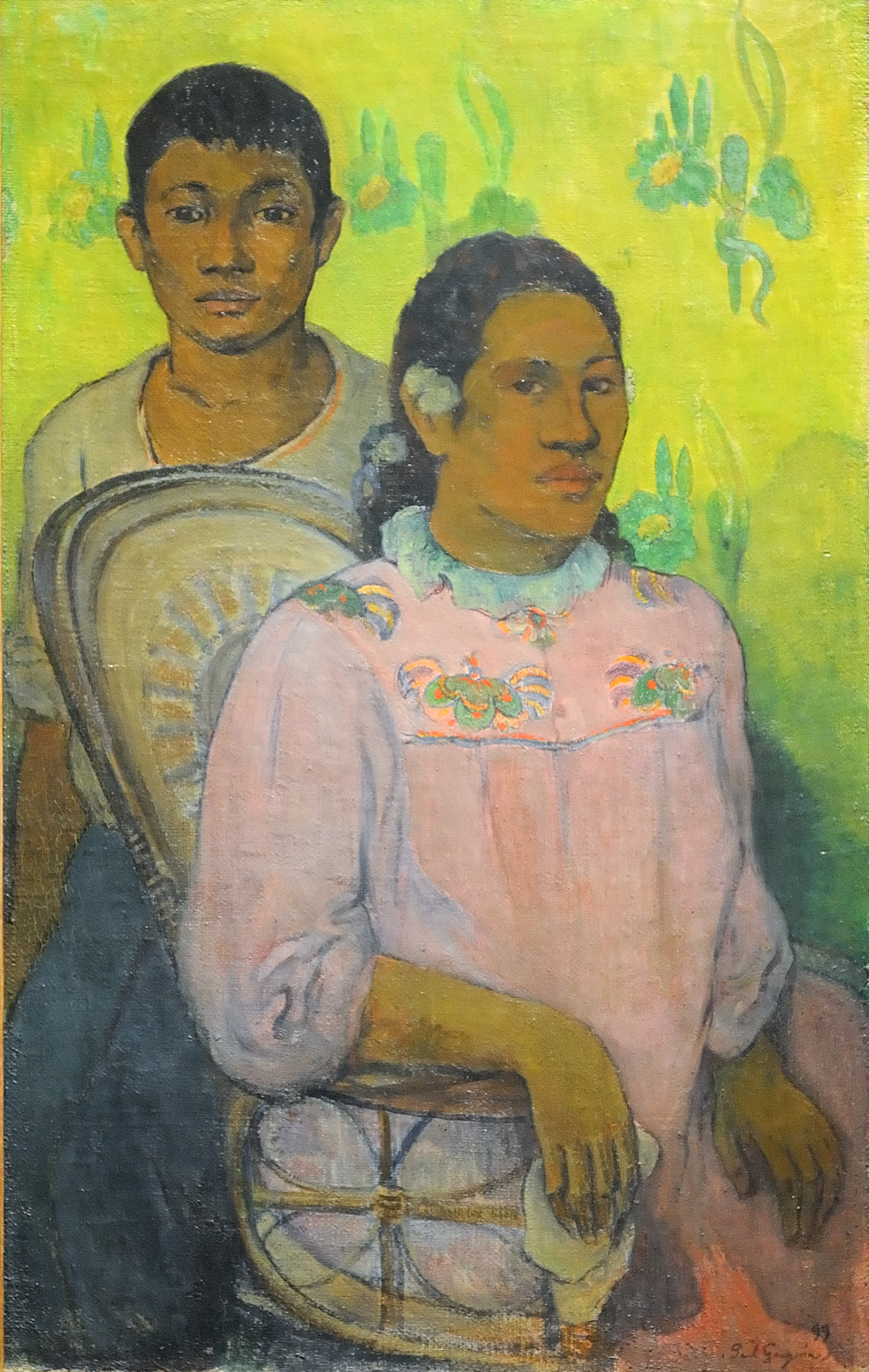
- Artist: Paul Gauguin
- Year: 1899
- Medium: oil on canvas
- Dimensions: 94.6 cm × 61.9 cm (37.2 in × 24.4 in)
- Location: Norton Simon Museum, Pasadena, California

Tahitian Woman and Boy is an 1899 painting by Paul Gauguin, now in the Norton Simon Museum, to which it was donated in 1976.

In 1964 the painting was bought at auction by the American dealers Hammer Galleries after its whereabouts had been unknown for 40 years. It had actually been hanging in the remote Ardross Castle in the Scottish Highlands after having been acquired in 1923 for 1,200 pounds sterling.

== See also ==
- List of paintings by Paul Gauguin
