= Study of a Nude =

1880 painting by Paul Gauguin

Study of a Nude (Suzanne sewing)
- Étude de nu (Suzanne cousant) (French)
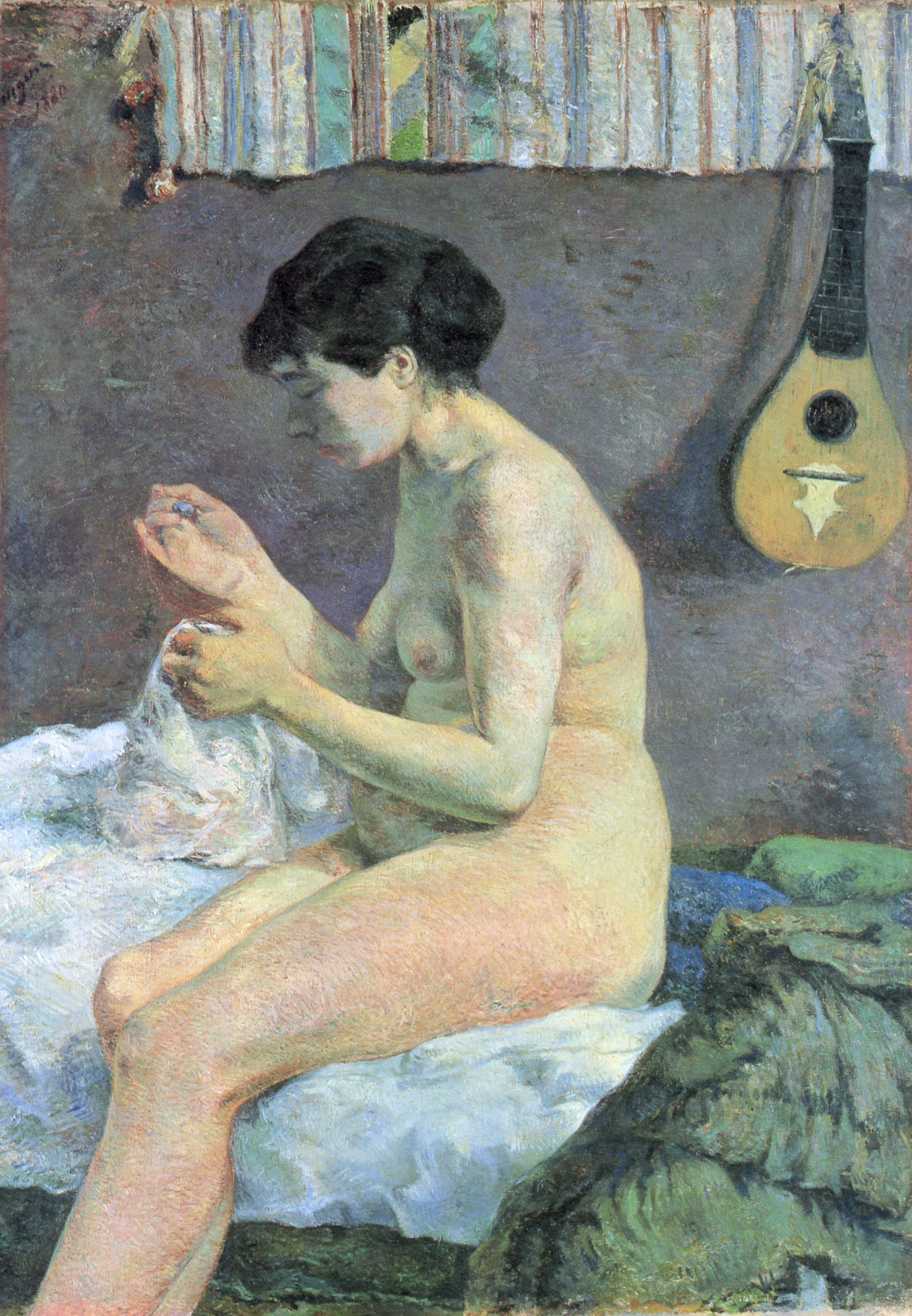
- Artist: Paul Gauguin
- Year: 1880
- Medium: Oil on canvas
- Dimensions: 114.5 cm × 79.5 cm (45.1 in × 31.3 in)
- Location: Ny Carlsberg Glyptotek; =Copenhagen

Study of a Nude, or Suzanne Sewing is an 1880 painting made by Paul Gauguin in Paris. It is currently in the collection of the Ny Carlsberg Glyptotek in Copenhagen. The painting depicts a young woman who is arranging a garment in undisguised nakedness.

== Subject ==
The painting depicts a young, nude woman who is arranging a garment. The scene is set in a bedroom with the woman sitting on an unmade bed against a mauve wall that is decorated with a mandolin and a tapestry. The body of the model is a three-quarter perspective with the head in profile. He depicts her body realistically, without idealisation. We see a bigger stomach with rolls, and her hands are disproportionately larger.

== History ==
Despite the impact the painting had on the Impressionist exhibition, Gauguin was unable to sell it. His wife, Mette, refused to hang the painting in their home. However, when Gauguin left his family in Copenhagen, the picture was held by her until it was sold in 1892 to the Danish artist, Theodor Philipsen.

In 1920, Philipsen donated the work to the Royal Museums of Fine Arts of Belgium, and since 1922, it has been in the collection of the Ny Carlsberg Glyptotek.

== See also ==
- List of paintings by Paul Gauguin
