= Landscape near Arles =

Painting by Paul Gauguin

- Ferme à Arles (French)
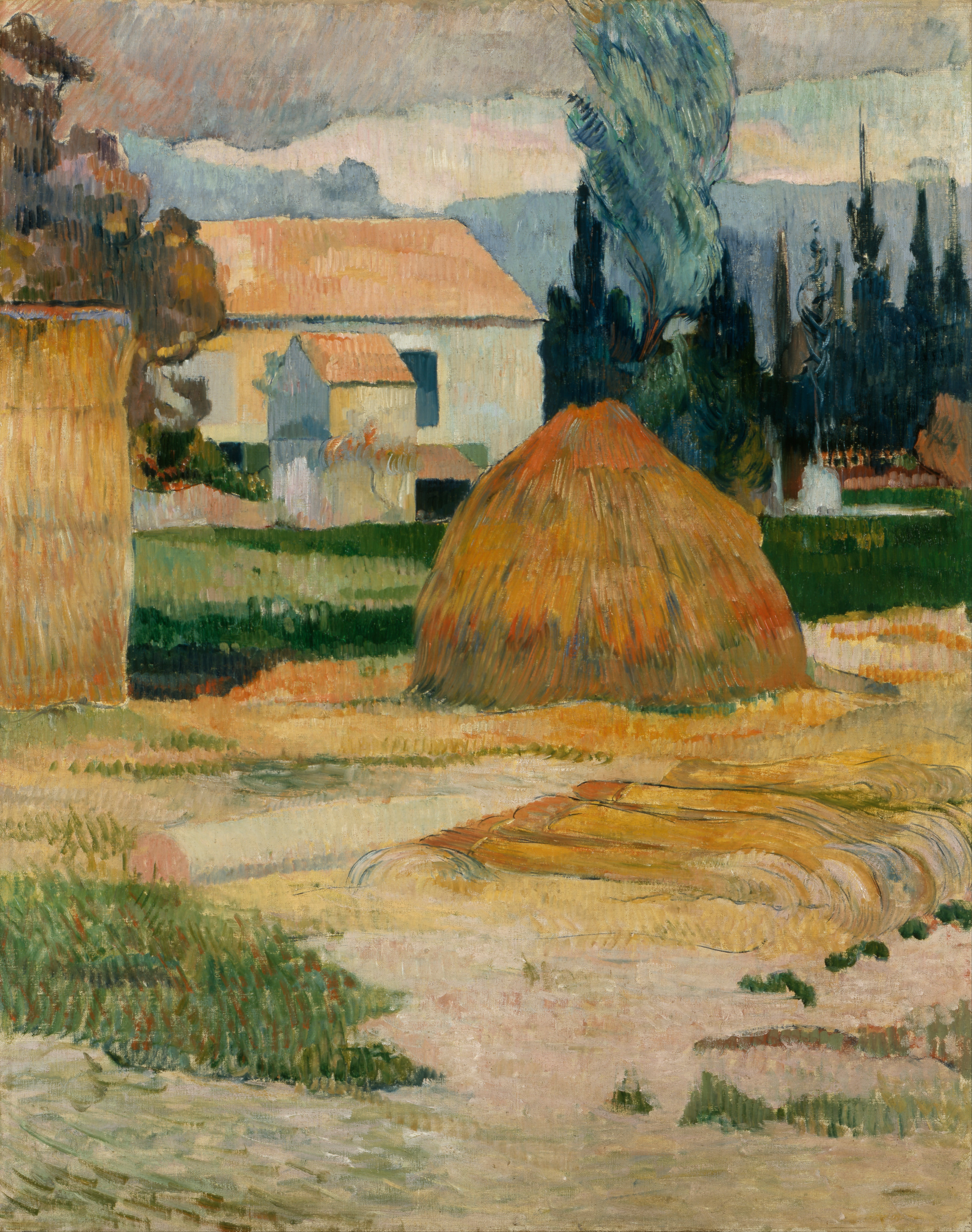
- Artist: Paul Gauguin
- Year: 1888
- Type: Oil painting on canvas
- Dimensions: 36 cm × 28.5 cm (14 in × 11.2 in)
- Location: Indianapolis Museum of Art, Indianapolis

Landscape near Arles is an 1888 oil painting by French artist Paul Gauguin depicting a rural scene in Provence. It is now in the Indianapolis Museum of Art in Indianapolis, Indiana.

== Description ==
Landscape near Arles depicts a typical scene from that area: the farmhouse is a traditional mas, cypress trees are common in the region, and the haystack is suitable for harvest time. Gauguin's treatment of the subject owes much to Paul Cézanne, whom Gauguin revered. His emphasis on geometric forms and the way his careful network of precisely placed brushstrokes locks the haystack and farmhouse together creates a highly ordered environment that owes much to Cézanne. The way he organizes the traditional French countryside makes nature itself conform to his own structural regimen. Only the bright, acidic hues indicate that Gauguin was painting next to Vincent van Gogh.

== Historical information ==
For two months, ending on Christmas 1888, Gauguin and van Gogh lived together in Arles. Their stormy relationship cut short the partnership, and the period ultimately had little effect upon Gauguin's art. Despite the clashing of their strong personalities, it was quite a productive period for them both. Van Gogh avidly wished to form an artistic enclave in the area, a desire that led to some mutual accommodation. This was the first painting Gauguin made during those months, on a linen canvas van Gogh stretched for him. The setting was one of van Gogh's favorites, the plains of the Crau.

=== Acquisition ===
In February 1944, Mrs. Julian Bobbs purchased Landscape near Arles for the John Herron School of Art as a gift in memory of William Ray Adams, her first husband. The painting remained with the IMA during the division, and currently is on display in the Sidney and Kathy Taurel gallery. It has the acquisition number 44.10.

== See also ==
- The Painter of Sunflowers
- List of paintings by Paul Gauguin
