= Fields by the Sea =

1889 painting by Paul Gauguin

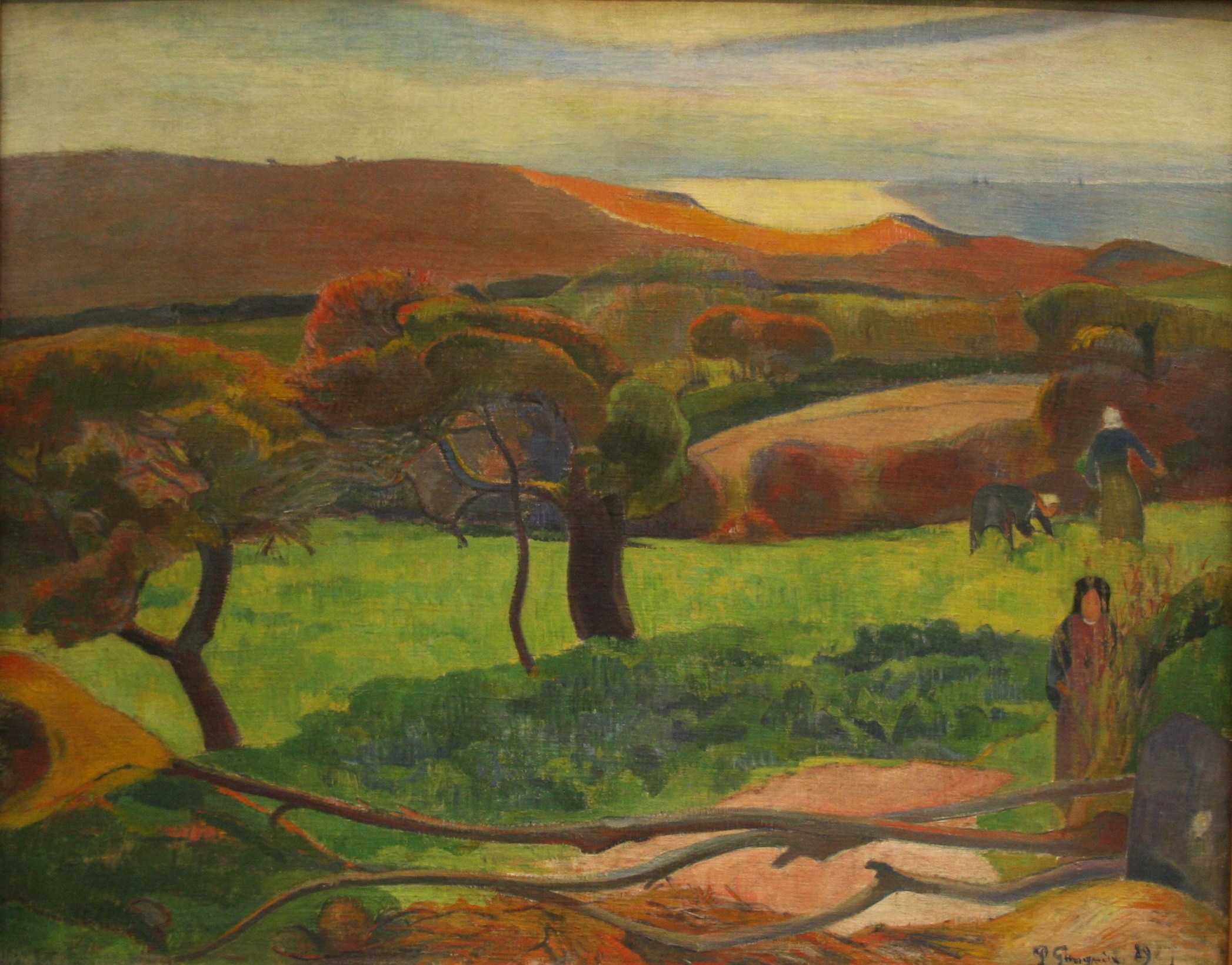
- Artist: Paul Gauguin
- Year: 1889
- Medium: Oil on canvas
- Dimensions: 72,5 cm × 91 cm (285 in × 36 in)
- Location: Nationalmuseum

Fields by the Sea (in French: Les Champs au bord de la mer) is an 1889 oil on canvas painting by Paul Gauguin. It is also called Landscape from Bretagne. The painting is exhibited at the Nationalmuseum in Stockholm.

In the 1880s, Paul Gauguin occasionally went to Brittany, where he was taken by the landscape and local traditions. This painting shows an actual part of the coast, in a subjective interpretation where the decorative effects of colour fields and contours are the key element. The orange sections have shadows in a contrasting blue. This new style was called Synthetism. In autumn 1892, the artist Richard Bergh bought the painting from Gauguin's Danish wife. This painting inspired many Swedish artists.

== See also ==
- List of paintings by Paul Gauguin
