= Ia Orana Maria =

Painting by Paul Gauguin

Ia Orana Maria (Hail Mary)
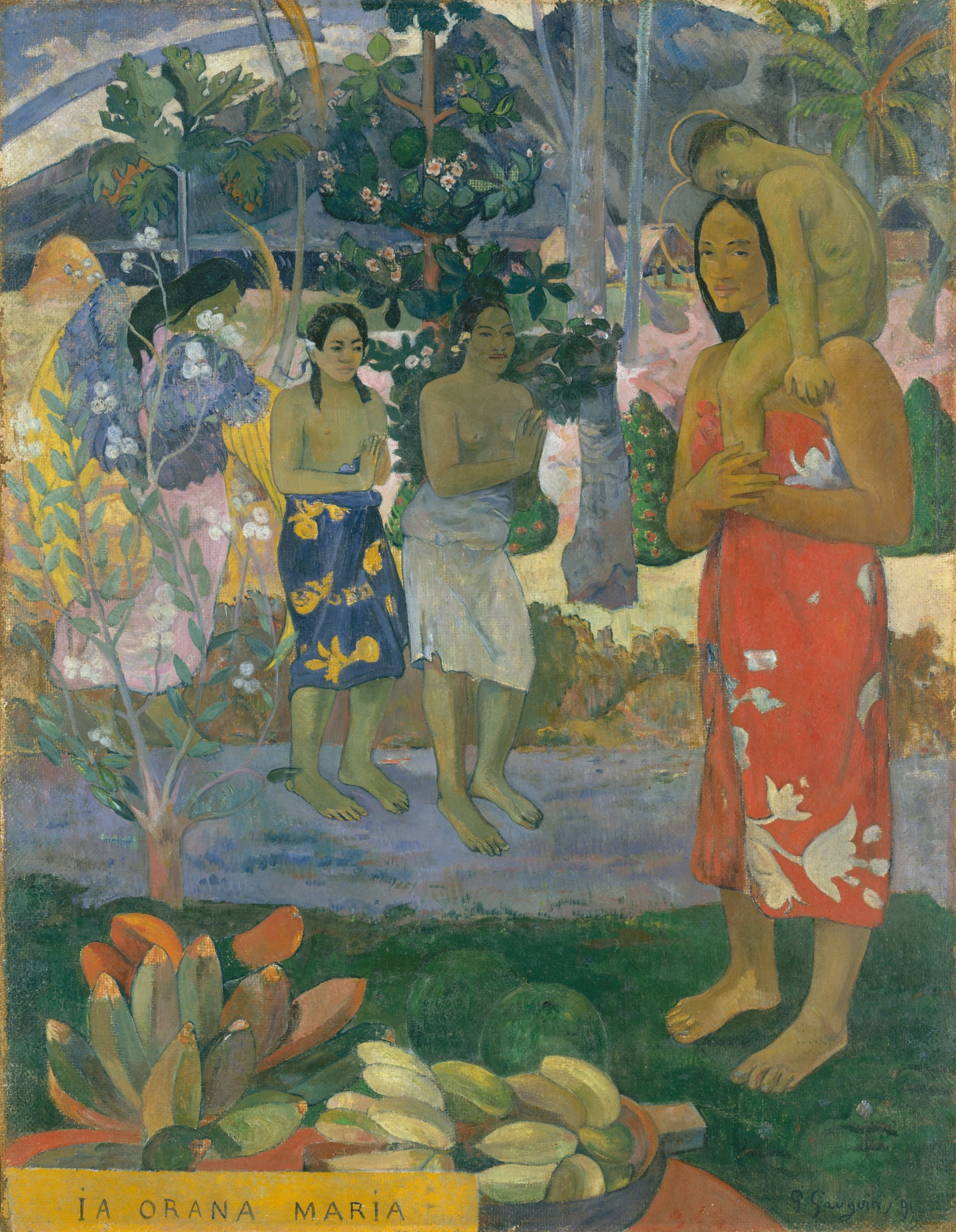
- Artist: Paul Gauguin
- Year: 1891
- Medium: Oil on canvas
- Dimensions: 114 cm × 88 cm (45 in × 35 in)
- Location: Metropolitan Museum of Art, New York

Ia Orana Maria (Hail Mary) is an 1891 oil-on-canvas painting by the French artist Paul Gauguin, now housed in the Metropolitan Museum of Art in New York. Created shortly after the artist’s arrival in Tahiti, it is considered one of the earliest and most emblematic works of his Tahitian period. In the composition, two Polynesian women greet a Tahitian mother and child, whom Gauguin deliberately reimagines within the Christian framework of the Madonna and Child while situating them in a distinctly local setting. The painting marks Gauguin’s first major attempt to fuse Western religious iconography with what he perceived as the spiritual and visual qualities of Tahitian life, embodying many stylistic themes that would define Gauguin's work in the Pacific.

== Context ==
Paul Gauguin painted la Orana Maria in 1891 during his first stay in Tahiti, where he sought what he imagined to be an untouched, “primitive” world in contrast to European modernity. The painting reinterprets the Christian Madonna and Child through Polynesian figures and landscape, an approach Gauguin himself described in an 1892 letter to Daniel de Monfreid. Writing from Tahiti, he explained:

I have…made a size 50 canvas. An angel with yellow wings points out Mary and Jesus, both Tahitians, to two Tahitian women, nudes wrapped in pareus, a sort of cotton cloth printed with flowers that can be draped as one likes from the waist. [There is] a very somber, mountainous background and flowering trees, [also] a dark violet path and an emerald green foreground, with bananas on the left,—I’m rather happy with it.

Although Gauguin explored themes of Catholic theology in his art during his second stay in the South Seas, la Orana Maria is the only explicitly Christian painting from his first trip to Tahiti. There are several theories regarding what motivated Gauguin to create la Orana Maria. According to one account attributed to his son Pola, the painting commemorates news that Gauguin’s mistress in Paris had given birth to his illegitimate son. Other interpretations suggest that the work marks Gauguin’s recovery from a nearly fatal illness or that he intended to present the painting to the Catholic missionary church near his new home in Mataiea.

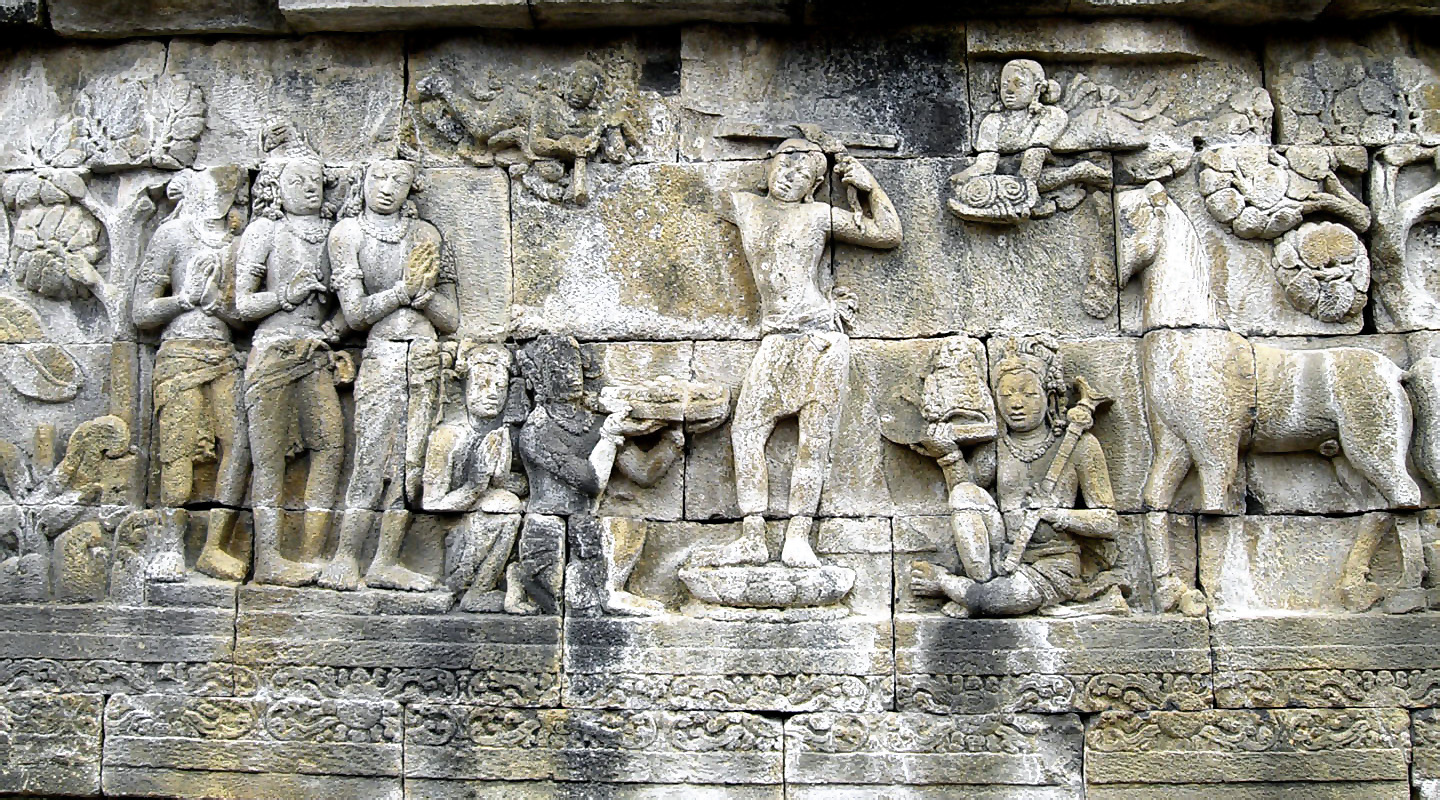
Ancient bas-relief from the Javanese temple at Borobudur.

In addition to Tahitian influence, Gauguin drew inspiration from the relief sculpture of Borobudur, the 9th-century Buddhist temple in Java of which Gauguin owned photographs. Gauguin imitated these frieze-like qualities in la Orana Maria by depicting the Polynesian women in rigid, simplified poses set in a shallow, relief-like space, rather than a naturalistic one. Specifically, the two native women in the left background bring their hands together in prayer modeled after two monks greeting Buddha in the relief sculpture. This borrowing let Gauguin merge Tahitian subject matter with a visual language he associated with ancient, spiritually resonant art, giving the composition its ceremonial character.

== Description ==
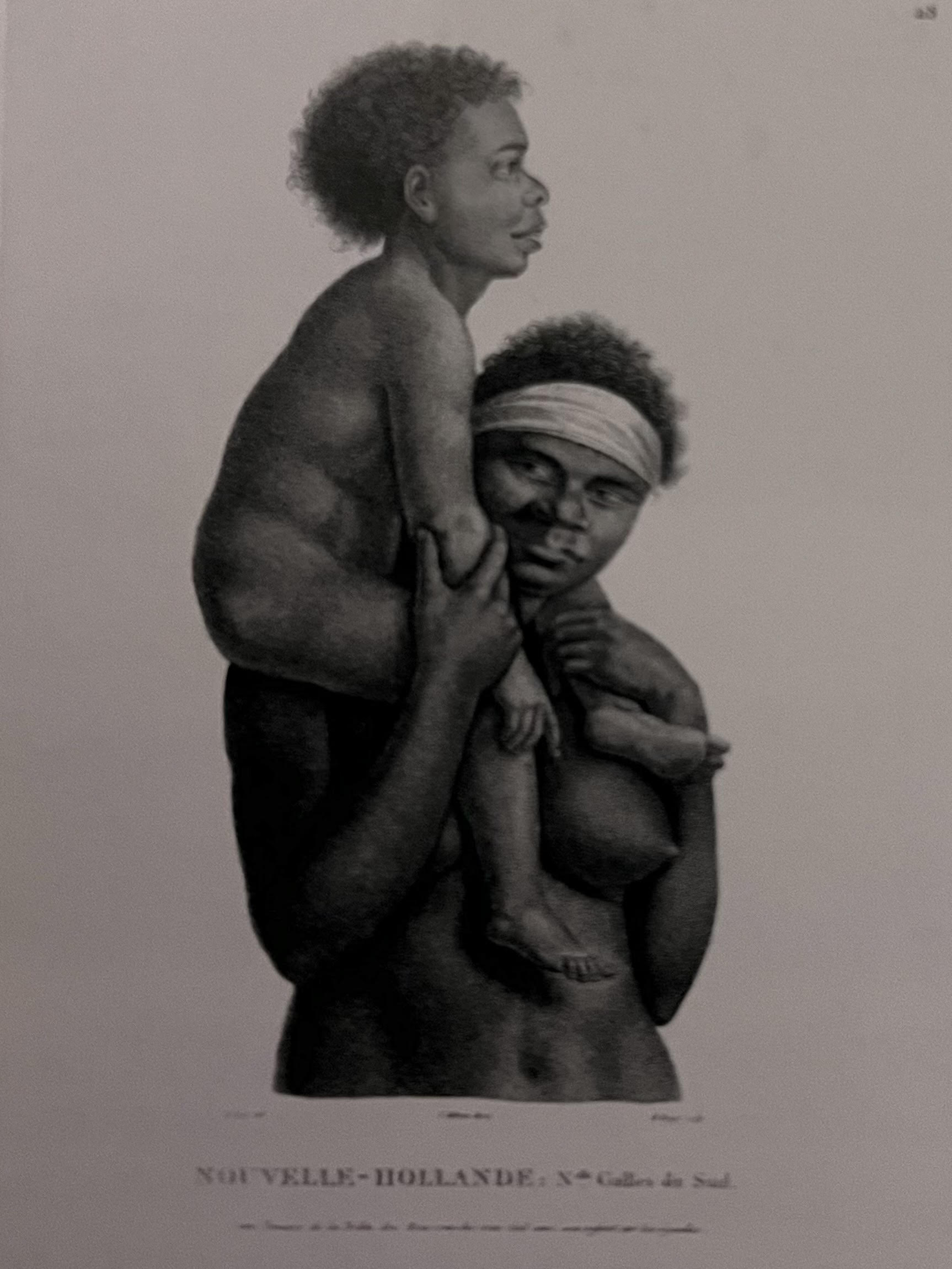
Mother Carrying a Child on Her Shoulder, New Zealand. Lithograph in François Péron and Louis de Freyeinet, Voyage de découvertes aux Terres Australes (Paris, 1824).

Gauguin’s reworking of religious iconography blends Catholic motifs with Tahitian forms, while foreground elements anchor the scene in the local environment adding a tangible, exotic texture to the painting. The composition juxtaposes sacred figures with a lush tropical setting, where stylized colors and bold outlines heightening the painting's otherworldliness. On the left side of the background, an angel floats serenely, dressed in a pale lavender gown with wings rendered in shades of yellow, blue, and purple. In the foreground, the two nude Polynesian women are draped in vivid red and blue pareus: traditional Tahitian skirts printed with floral patterns. The composition’s vibrant colors and detailed flora emphasize the exoticism of Tahiti, capturing what the art historian Richard Brettell describes as "any Westerner's fantasy of paradise on earth...la Orana Maria is a hymn to the diversity and richness of color." In the foreground, a wooden altar holds a cluster of fei, wild red bananas prized as a delicacy, alongside two round breadfruits and a local bowl filled with maia, or yellow bananas.

The central focus of the painting is the Madonna and Child on the right. Scholars have debated whether the depiction of a Tahitian mother carrying her child over the shoulder accurately reflects local practices of the period. One critic claims that Mary’s manner of carrying the child is unusual for the Indigenous people of the time, resembling instead the practice of Egyptian peasant communities, who traditionally carried children over the shoulder. Another argues that the lithograph Mother Carrying a Child on Her Shoulder, New Zealand, provides evidence that natives in the South Pacific carried children on their shoulders as depicted in Gauguin's work.

== Religious symbolism and interpretations ==
la Orana Maria illustrates various elements of traditional Christian iconography through a Tahitian lens. The painting has been interpreted as a version of the biblical episode of the Annunciation, with the angel signaling the presence of the Madonna and Child. Here, the Annunciation is placed within a landscape that merges paradise and the Garden of Eden. The painting is also thought to represent the Adoration of the Shepherds, a traditional Christian scene in which figures come to pay homage to the newborn Christ. While the figures are not literally shepherds, their gestures and positioning echo the humility and devotion typically conveyed in the biblical scene. In both interpretations, the palm branch held by the angel—a traditional symbol of martyrdom and death—introduces a subtle, ironic tension, undercutting the otherwise joyous and idyllic vision of paradise. Richard Brittell sees the painting as exemplifying the critic Octave Mirabeau's description of Gauguin's work as “a disquieting and spicy mixture of barbaric splendor, Catholic liturgy, Hindu reverie, Gothic imagery, and obscure, subtle symbolism."

== Ownership ==
Following its 1893 exhibition in Paris, la Orana Maria was one of the few works Gauguin managed to sell. The 2,000 francs he received was the highest price of any work he had sold up to that date. The painting was purchased by Michel Manzi, a prominent collector and close friend of Degas, known for his work in developing art reproduction techniques. Shortly after the exhibition, a photograph of la Orana Maria appeared in Figaro Illustré, and Gauguin later hand-colored a copy of this reproduction to include in his Noa Noa manuscript, which documented his second journey to the South Seas.

== See also ==
- List of paintings by Paul Gauguin

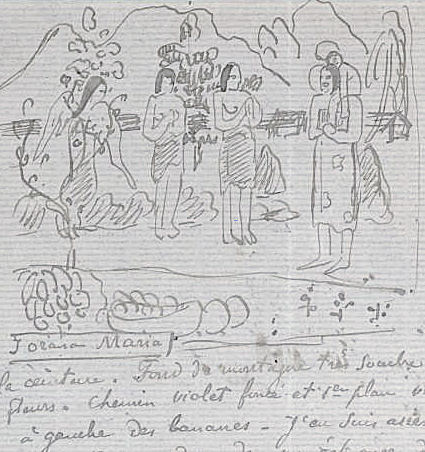
Ink sketch for Ia Orana Maria (1892; Paris)
