= Eiaha Ohipa =

Painting by Paul Gauguin

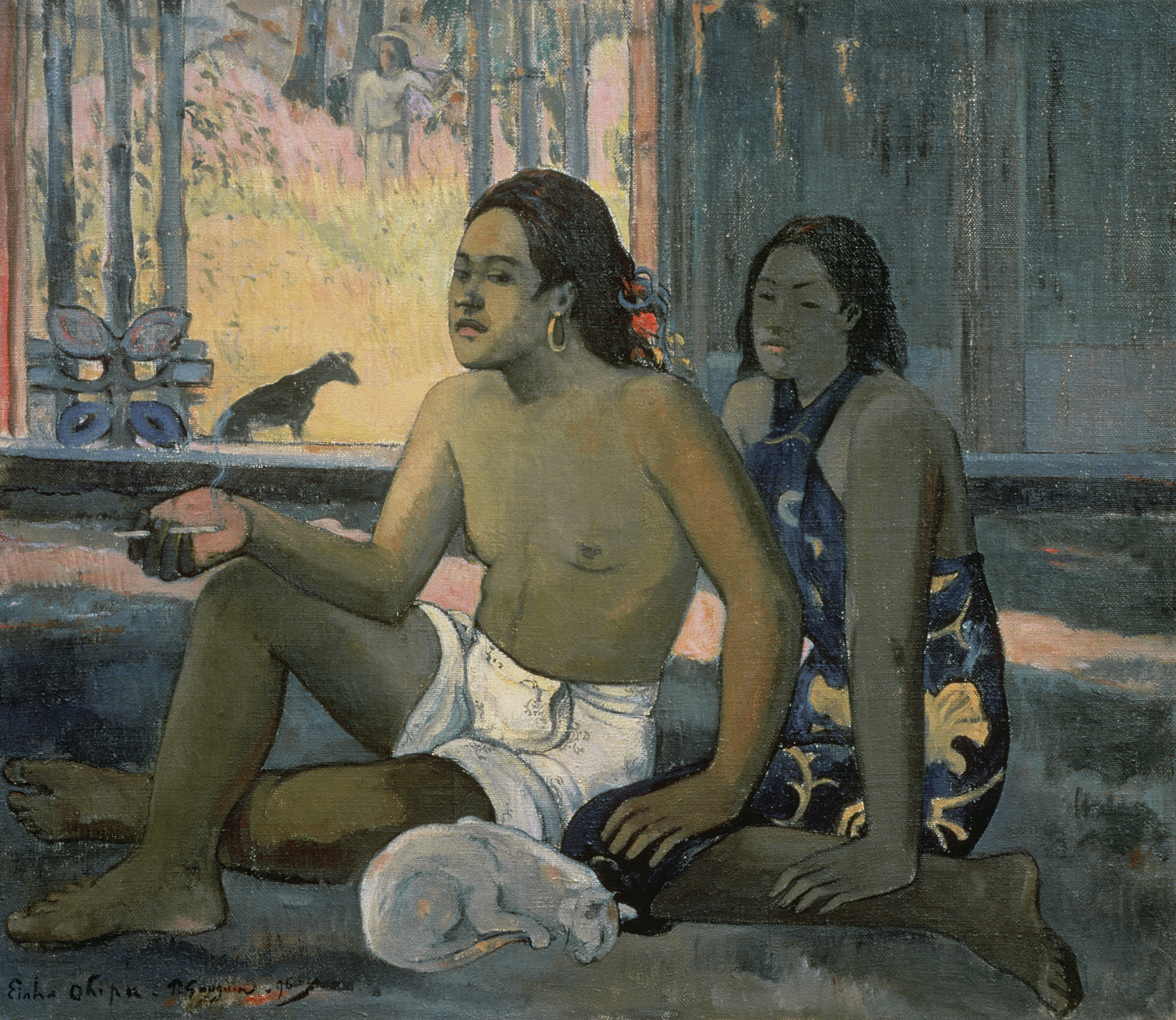
- Artist: Paul Gauguin
- Year: 1896
- Type: Oil paint on canvas
- Dimensions: 65 by 75 centimetres (26 in × 30 in)
- Location: Pushkin State Museum of Fine Arts, Moscow, Russia

Eiaha Ohipa (English: Not Working) is an 1896 oil on canvas painting by Paul Gauguin, now in Pushkin Museum, Moscow. It was produced during his second stay in Tahiti.

The painting depicts two young Tahitians passing the time idling in a hut smoking whilst through the window the artist can be seen painting. The motif of an open window with the silhouette of a dog can be seen in other of Gauguin's works such as his Te Faaturuma of 1891.

The painting symbolises the relaxed, natural and contemplative lifestyle of the Tahiti islanders.
