= Self-Portrait in a Hat =

Painting by Paul Gauguin

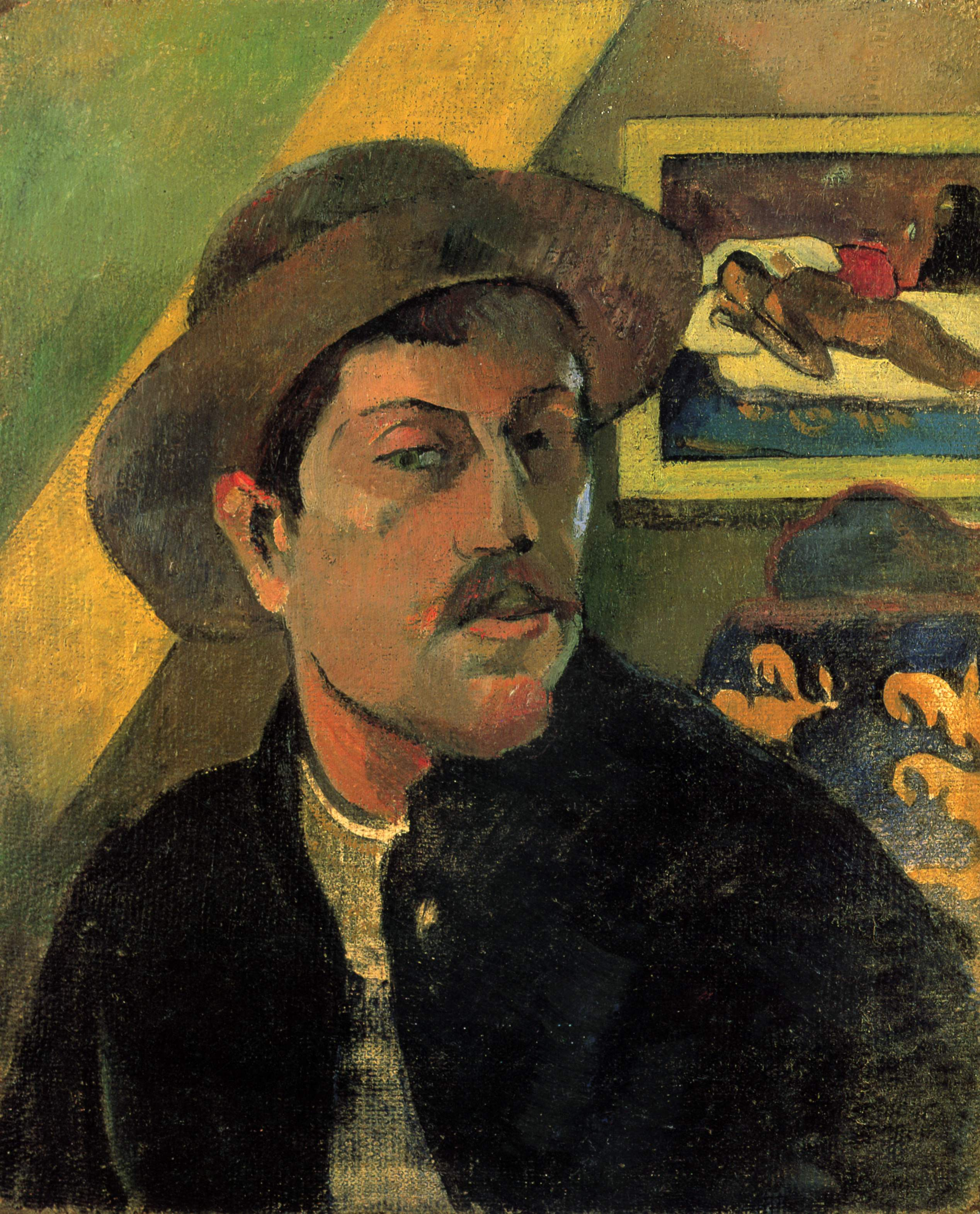
- Artist: Paul Gauguin
- Year: 1893
- Medium: oil on canvas
- Dimensions: 45 cm × 38 cm (18 in × 15 in)
- Location: Musée d’Orsay, Paris

Self-Portrait in a Hat is an 1893 oil on canvas self portrait by Paul Gauguin, produced following a trip to Tahiti. He shows himself in his Paris studio with Spirit of the Dead Watching in the background. It is now in the Musée d’Orsay in Paris.
