= Tahitian Woman with a Flower =

Painting by Paul Gauguin

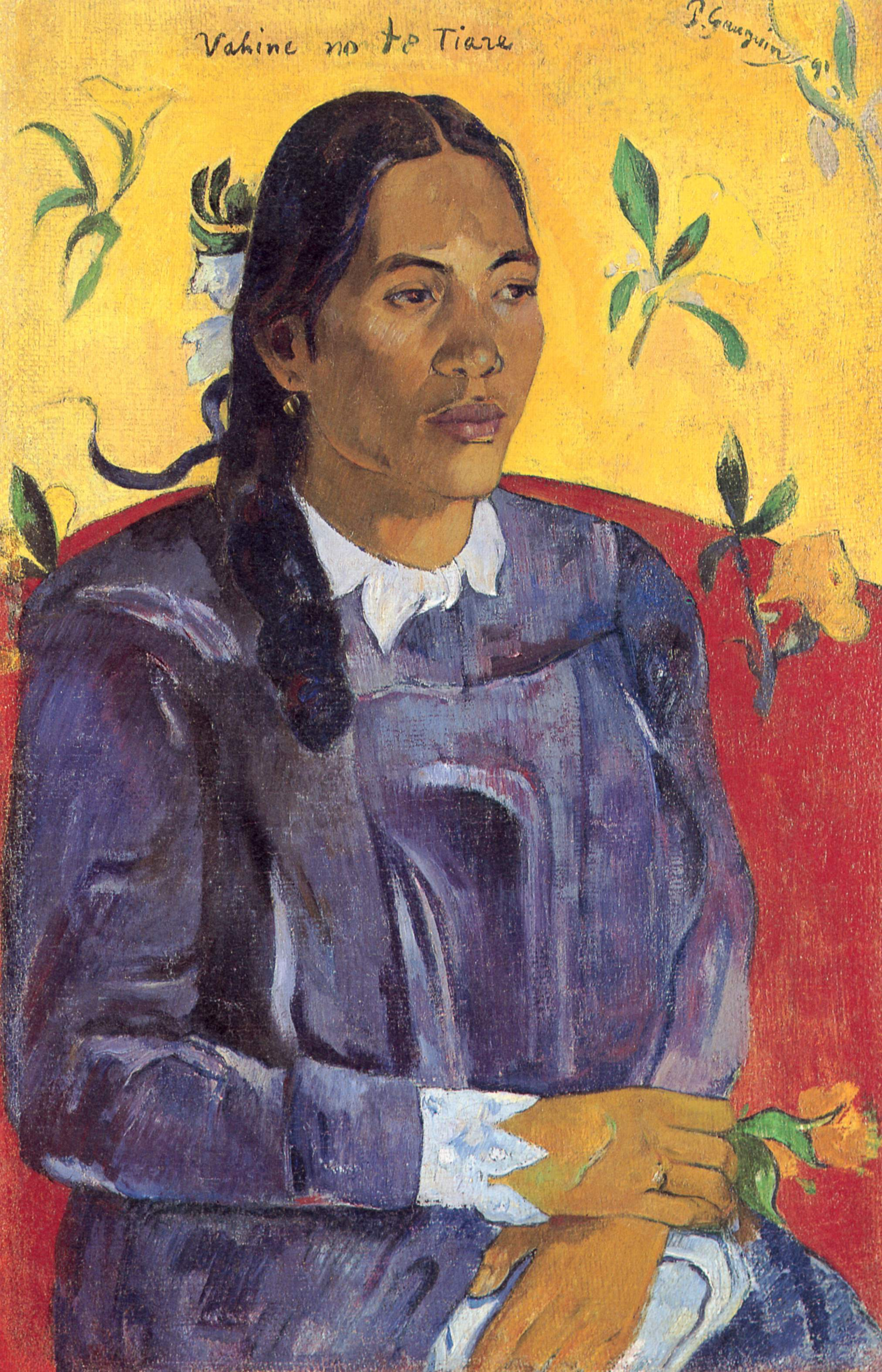
- Artist: Paul Gauguin
- Year: 1891
- Medium: Oil on canvas
- Dimensions: 70.5 cm × 46.5 cm (27.8 in × 18.3 in)
- Location: Ny Carlsberg Glyptotek, Copenhagen

Tahitian Woman with a Flower (Vahine no te tiare) is an 1891 painting by Paul Gauguin, now in the Ny Carlsberg Glyptotek in Copenhagen.

According to biographer Sue Prideaux, it was Gauguin's first Tahitian portrait.

== See also ==
- List of paintings by Paul Gauguin
