= A Man with an Axe =

Painting by Paul Gauguin

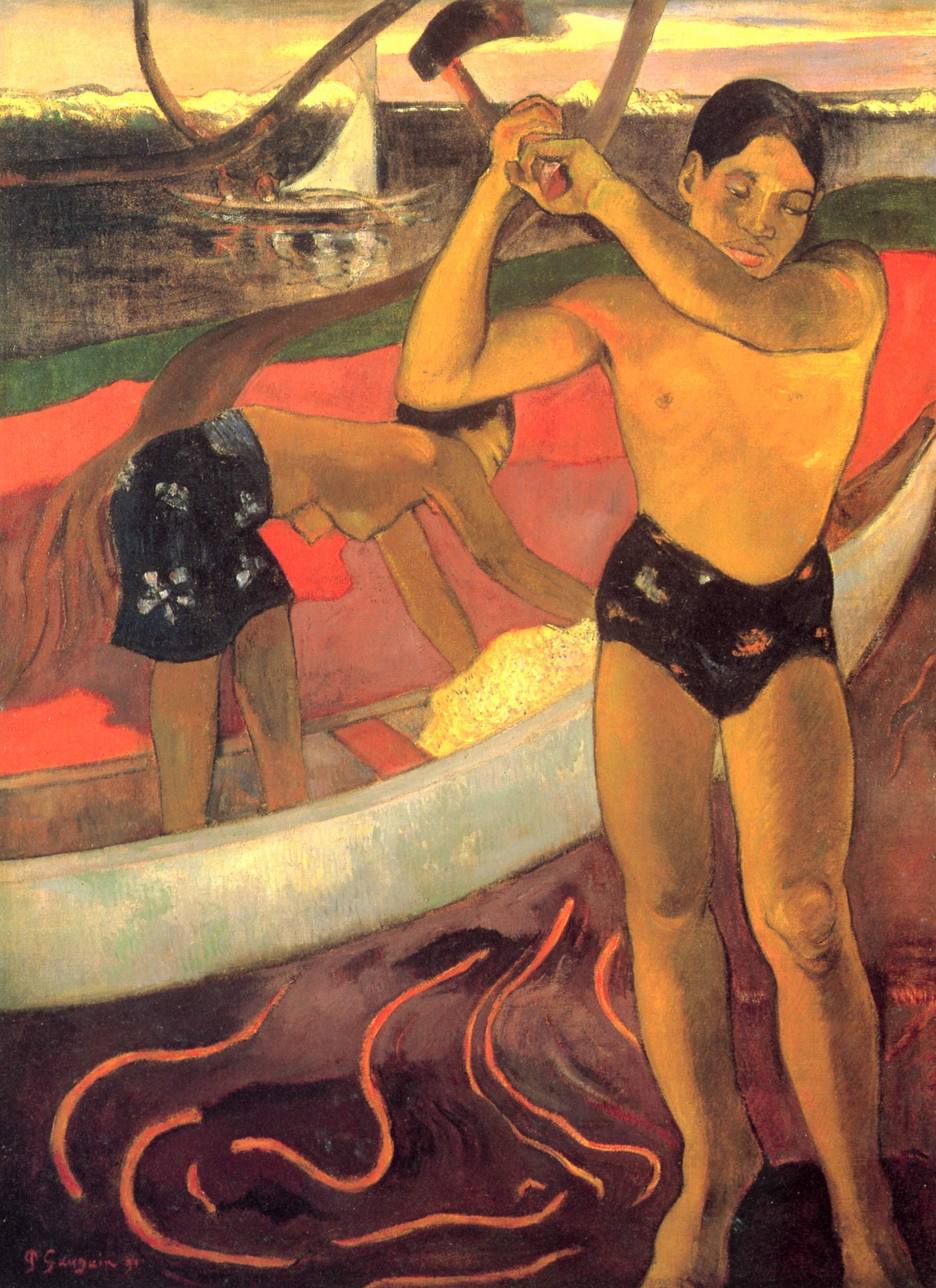
- Artist: Paul Gauguin
- Year: 1891
- Medium: Oil on canvas
- Dimensions: 92.7 cm × 70 cm (36.5 in × 28 in)
- Location: private collection

A Man with an Axe is an 1891 oil on canvas painting by Paul Gauguin, now in a Swiss private collection. It is one his first major paintings from his Tahiti period being painted shortly after his arrival in Papeete. A study for it is now in the Art Institute of Chicago.

== History ==
Paul Gauguin would arrive in Papeete on Tahiti in the summer of 1891. He came looking a simplicity that he had failed to find in Paris. The scene of a man with an axe chopping at a dead tree and a woman arranging nets was one that Gauguin observed in front of his hut. Gauguin referred to this central figure as "Totefa", "Jotepha", "Jotefa" and versions of Joseph" although these may all be his own inventions. Gauguin used some of the most potent colours that had been seen in painting up until that point which he explained as his observations of the natural hues of Tahiti and his forgoing of the traditional European studio procedure.

It has been interpreted that the painting represents the ending of Gauguin's moral crisis and his liberation from the conventions of European culture. It has also been said to represent the Gauguin's fascination with the "primitive"; with the man representing raw masculine power and the woman being a symbol of pre-Christian innocent sexuality. (Note: According to David Sweetman since she is bare-breasted it "shows that the scene could not have been taken from life–such sights were no longer available to him [...] Rather, the whole picture is an evocation of a golden age of the innocent Tahiti before the missionaries with their Mother Hubbards and their talk of sin.")

== See also ==
- List of paintings by Paul Gauguin
