= Vairumati =

Painting by Paul Gauguin

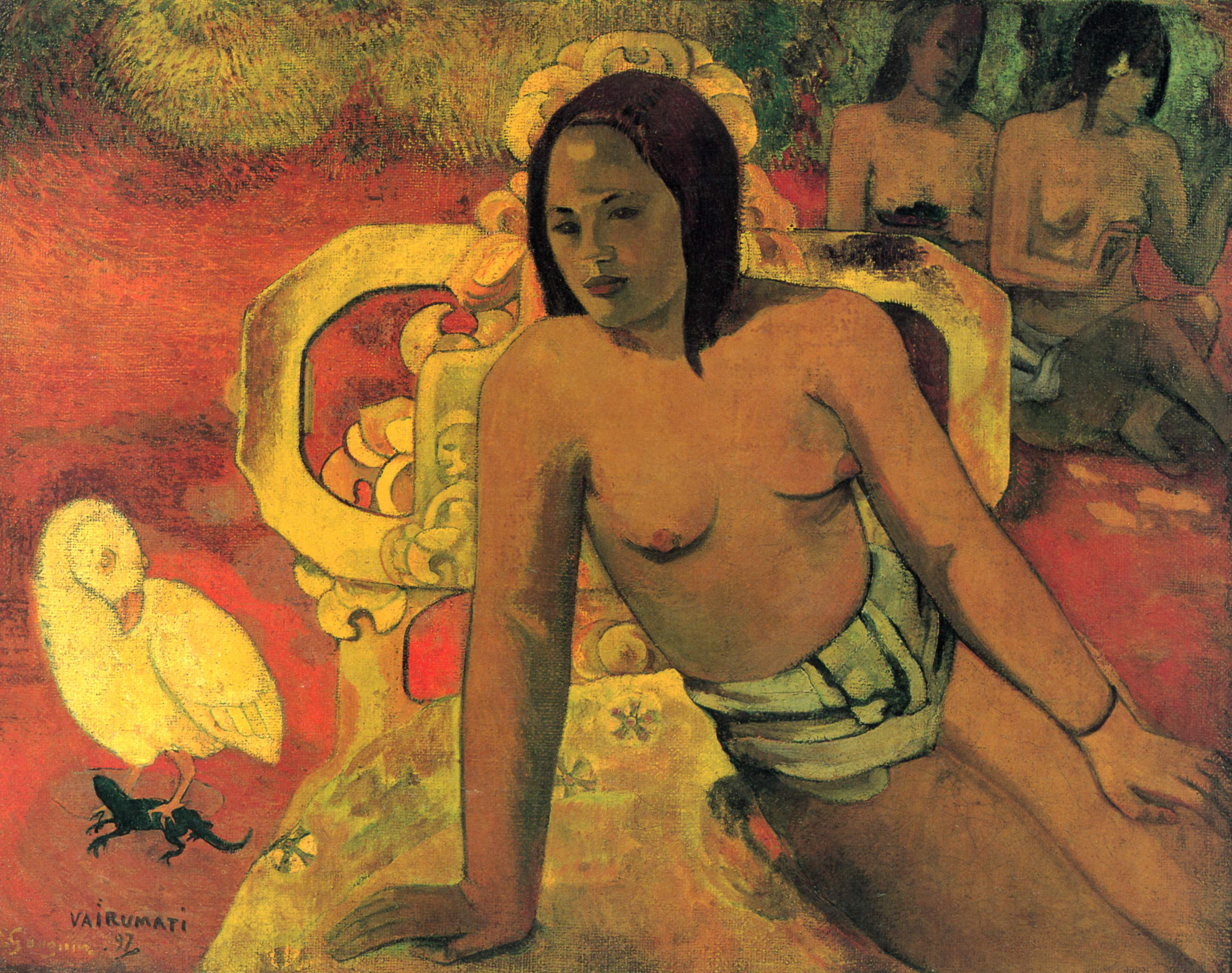
- Artist: Paul Gauguin
- Year: 1897
- Medium: oil on canvas
- Movement: symbolism
- Dimensions: 73 cm × 94 cm (29 in × 37 in)
- Location: Musée d'Orsay, Paris

Vairumati is an 1897 oil on canvas painting by Paul Gauguin, now in the Musée d'Orsay in Paris.
