= Merahi metua no Tehamana =

Painting by Paul Gauguin

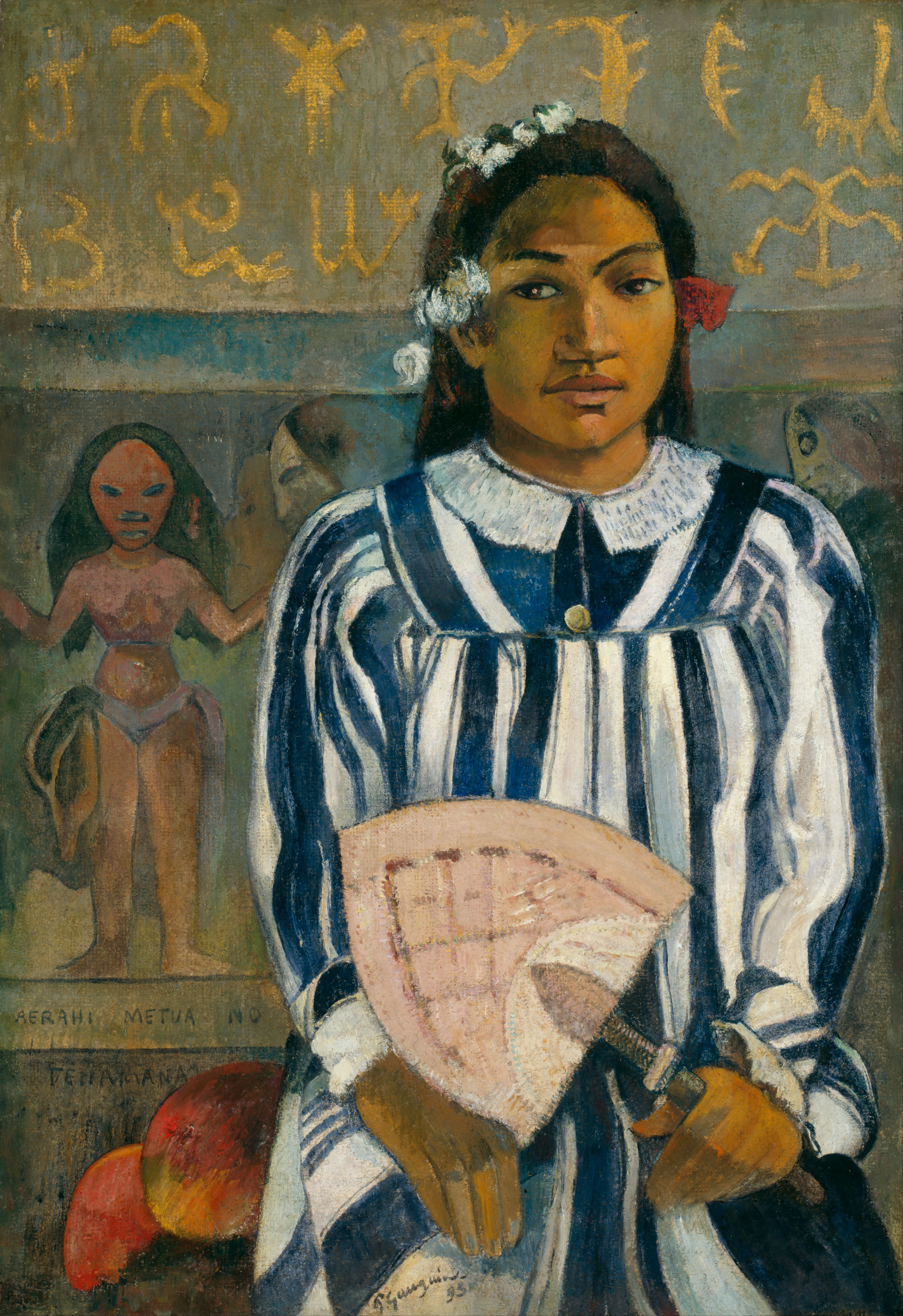
- Artist: Paul Gauguin
- Year: 1893
- Type: Oil painting
- Location: Art Institute of Chicago, Chicago

Merahi metua no Tehamana ('Tehamana Has Many Parents' or 'The Ancestors of Tehamana') is an 1893 painting by the French artist Paul Gauguin, currently in the collection of the Art Institute of Chicago.

The painting is a portrait of Paul Gauguin's wife Tehaʼamana during his first visit to Tahiti in 1891–1893. The marriage, which was arranged and completed in the course of a single afternoon, has long stirred controversy because Gauguin claimed Tehaʼamana was just thirteen years old at the time.

A sculpture, Head of a Tahitian Woman, is also known to be a portrait of Tehaʼamana. She is assumed to have posed for numerous other paintings of the time, including the celebrated Spirit of the Dead Watching and Vahine no te vi.

== Tehaʼamana ==
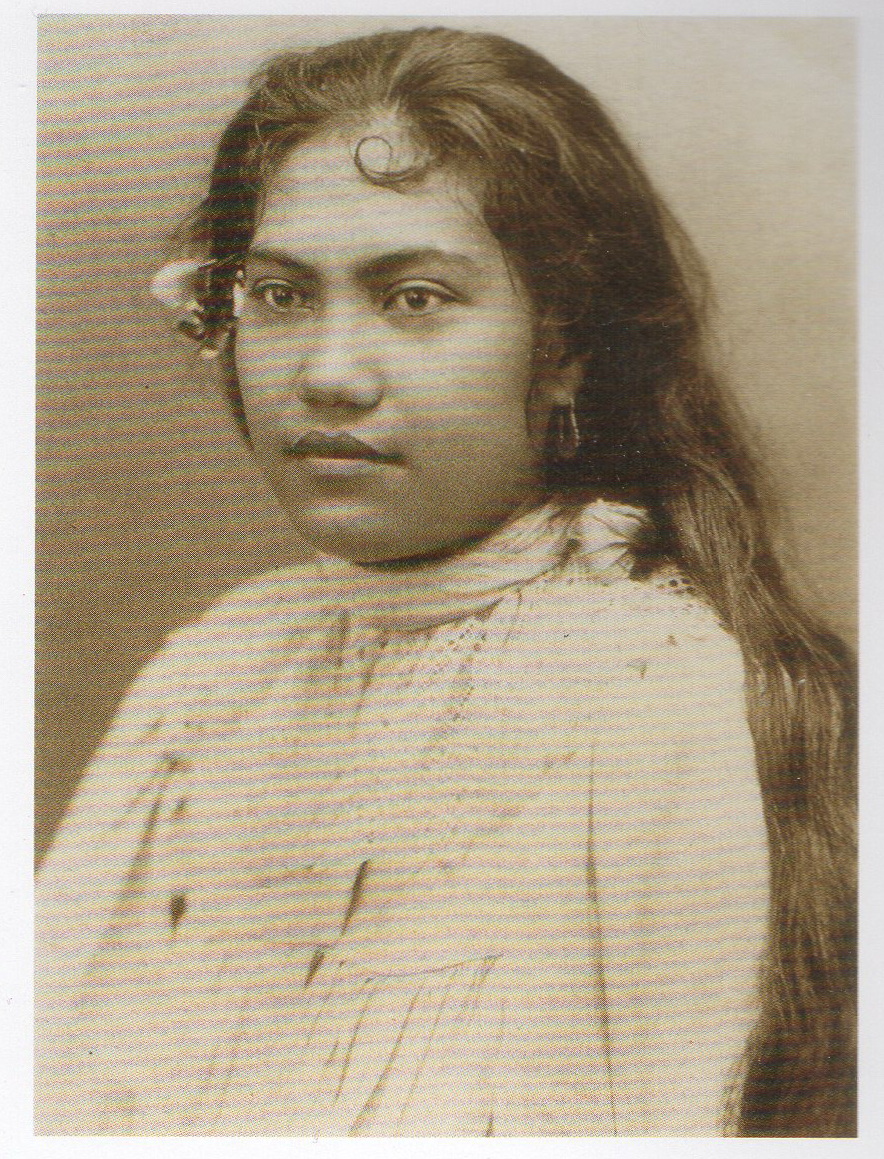
A photograph by Charles Georges Spitz circa 1888 is often reproduced as a portrait of Tehaʼamana, although there is no evidence for the identification.

Tehaʼamana was the native wife of Paul Gauguin during his first visit to Tahiti from 1891 to 1893. It was common at that time for French colonists to take native wives; the wives were simply referred to as vahine, Tahitian for 'woman'. These vahines were often underage children, as was the case with Tehaʼamana, their marriage being arranged by their family for reasons of status or financial advantage. The marriages were generally not legally binding. Of Gauguin's three vahines, the two he took after Tehaʼamana eventually returned home while Tehaʼamana herself declined to continue their relationship when Gauguin returned to Tahiti in 1895. Tehaʼamana undoubtedly saw herself as conventionally married according to her local customs, but for Gauguin, the marriage was clearly a temporary arrangement. Nevertheless, he did profess a tender love for Tehaʼamana in his journal Noa Noa. (Note: See Solomon-Godeau p. 326 for a feminist deconstruction of the Gauguin pastorale. Danielsson (1965) called Gauguin's love for Tehaʼamana "anthropological", i.e. not transferable across cultures, and noted that Gauguin at this time concealed his affair with Tehaʼamana from his estranged wife Mette Gad in Copenhagen, as well as taking care to describe Mette as his "late wife" to Tehaʼamana (p. 115).) Pierre Loti's Le Mariage de Loti, a book that influenced Gauguin's decision to travel to Tahiti, was an immensely popular account of such a marriage twenty years earlier, although in that case, the marriage was actually a fictional composite of many casual liaisons indulged by Loti during a two-month visit to Papeete. In Loti's account, his wife was fourteen years old, while in Gauguin's account, Tehaʼamana was thirteen years old.

The name Tehaʼamana is formed from the definite article te, the causative particle ha'a and the substantive mana ('strength'), and thus signifies 'giver of strength', hence its frequent occurrence in ancient prayers and folklore. In his account of their idyll together, Gauguin described how in the evenings Tehaʼamana would recount their ancient myths as they lay in bed. Tehaʼamana was nevertheless a Christian, as evidenced by the missionary dress she wears in the portrait, and would most likely have known nothing of Tahitian mythology. Bengt Danielsson, the Kon-Tiki anthropologist, notes that Tehaʼamana recounting the old myths is an especially barefaced fiction, because not only were these largely forgotten; they had always been withheld from women. All of Gauguin's accounts of ancient Tahitian religion in Noa Noa were copied from other sources without adequate acknowledgement. (Note: Wadley (1985), acknowledging that Tehaʼamana would have known nothing about the ancient myths, examines pp. 108-19 the question of Gauguin's plagiarism from Jacques-Antione Morenhout's 1837 Voyage aux îles du Grand Océan, defending Gauguin on the grounds that Noa Noa was always conceived as a wedding of fact and fiction. He gives some examples where Morenhout is indirectly credited, for example in a remark, "Who created the sky and the earth? Morenhout and Tehura answered me ...!")

Men took vahines for sexual and other practical advantages, such as gathering food supplies. This was because Tahitian families were self-sufficient in food. The staples of breadfruit and bananas were gathered high in the mountains on a weekly basis, while fish was abundant in the lagoons. Pigs were hunted in the undergrowth. As a consequence, there was no trade in foodstuffs and offering food was regarded as an act of charity. Instead of gathering the food himself, Gauguin opted to take a vahine so that her family could provide for him. Having a vahine meant at least he had access to wild fruit and fresh shrimp gathered by her, as well as her own family's extensive food stores.

Gauguin's account of Tehaʼamana in Noa Noa, where he refers to her as Tehura, is mainly confined to their marriage, contracted in a single afternoon in the course of a planned excursion around the island, and a few other episodes including notably the genesis of his painting Spirit of the Dead Watching. Danielsson was able to find some oral and civic sources in the course of his research.

Tehaʼamana's family came from Rarotonga, one of the Cook Islands. Before settling in Tahiti, they spent some time in Huahine, one of the Society Islands, where Tehaʼamana was born. In Tahiti they settled at Fa'aone, some fifteen miles to the east of Gauguin's bamboo hut at Mataiea, where Gauguin encountered them at some time during or after November 1891, taking Tehaʼamana as his vahine the same day. No birth certificate is known to confirm her age, but it is likely she was only in her early teens, as were his two subsequent vahines. She was pregnant by August 1892 according to a letter of Gauguin's, but there is no further record of the child: Danielsson thought it had been aborted, Mathews thinks it more likely was adopted, as was commonly the custom in Tahitian society. Gauguin records Tehaʼamana was at the quay on 14 June 1893 to wish him a traditionally tearful departure from Tahiti. When Gauguin returned in 1895, Tehaʼamana had married again, but nevertheless spent a week with him before returning to her husband, according to a letter Gauguin sent Monfreid. Gauguin makes no further mention of Tehaʼamana. After his death, when he had become famous, Tehaʼamana made no effort to come forward as his vahine. Mathews thinks this may indicate there was, in reality, no single Tehaʼamana, or that she was simply indifferent to his memory as a matter of little consequence.

After Gauguin left in 1893, Tehaʼamana remained in Mataiea, working at first for Chief Tetuanui, but soon marrying a young Tahitian boy, named Ma'ari, from neighbouring Papara. They had two sons, one of whom was still alive when Danielsson was researching Gauguin. From him, Danielsson gathered the information that the reason Tehaʼamana declined to live with Gauguin in 1895, despite generous gifts of bead necklaces and brass rings, was that she was repulsed by Gauguin and the syphilitic sores covering his entire body. (Note: Sue Taylor p.203 presents sources, including a letter from Armand Séguin to Roderic O'Conor, indicating that in early 1895, in Paris, Gauguin broke out in a syphilitic rash that delayed his departure for Tahiti by several months as he sought treatment.) Danielsson was able to locate a death certificate showing that Tehaʼamana died on 9 December 1918 in Mataiea from the Spanish flu epidemic that carried off a quarter of Tahiti's native population. She is buried in Mataiea, although her tombstone bears no indication of her relationship with Gauguin. A circa 1888 photograph of a young Tahitian girl by Charles Georges Spitz is often reproduced as one of Tehaʼamana, although Danielsson points out there is no evidence at all for the identification.

== Description ==
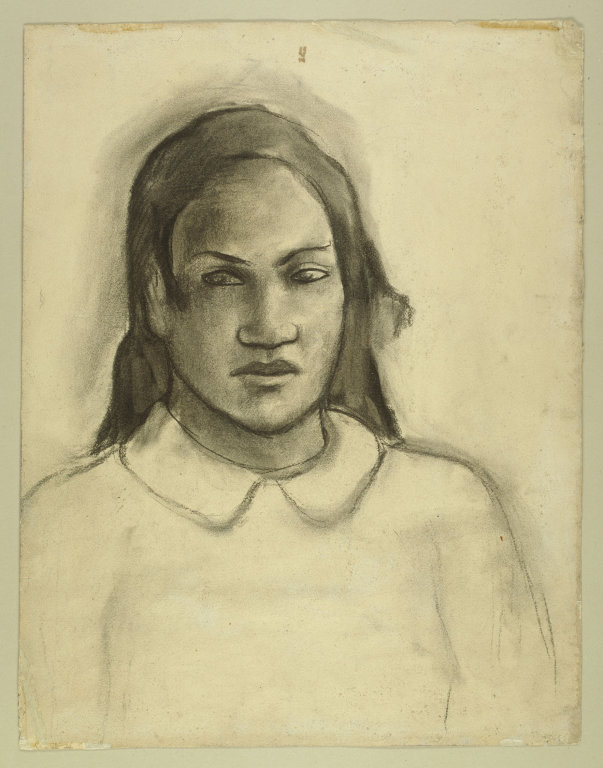
Charcoal study, c. 1891–1893, Art Institute of Chicago

The inscription below the idol reads "MERAHI METUA NO | TEHAMANA". This means 'Tehaʼamana has many parents', a reference to Tehaʼamana possessing foster parents as well as her natural parents in accordance with the faʼaʼamu Tahitian custom (Gauguin had to negotiate with both sets of parents when arranging the marriage). The placement of the inscription below the idol may also emphasise the belief that all Tahitians descended from the union of the ancient deities Hina and Ta'aroa.

Danielsson thought the painting a farewell portrait, depicting Tehaʼamana in a regal state dressed in her best churchgoing clothes and holding a plaited palm fan, a symbol of beauty. The red tiare flower she wears at her left ear signifies she is married. When he was researching his book, Danielsson showed a photograph of the portrait to a native, Puto'ura a Ta'iterafa'ato'a, fifteen years old in 1893 when the portrait was painted. Ta'iterafa'ato'a recognised Tehaʼamana at once, identifying the scar tissue above her right eye as the result of an accident she suffered when she was very young riding a pony, defying her parents. The portrait was bought at Gauguin's 1895 Hôtel Drouot auction at only 300 francs and subsequently gifted to Daniel de Monfreid, Gauguin's great champion in Tahiti, suggesting it held sentimental value for Gauguin.

Charles Stuckey remarks that the two ripe mangoes, placed on a low table to Tehaʼamana's right, probably represented the bounty of Tahiti, if not Tehaʼamana's fertility herself. The idol is taken to be a representation of Hina, borrowed from Hindu sculptures presenting the life-giving gesture. As a counterfoil, the heads that hover above each of Tehaʼamana's shoulders are evil spirits, suggesting a dialogue between good and evil or between life and death. The glyphs behind Tehaʼamana's head are Rongorongo glyphs from Easter Island, although Gauguin's examples are imaginary. These glyphs had been discovered scarcely thirty years earlier and Gauguin would have seen examples both at the Exposition Universelle of 1889 and in Papeete, where a local bishop researching them had a number of examples in his care. The glyphs have never been deciphered and Gauguin's intention was probably to emphasise the impenetrability of Tahitian culture. In his Noa Noa account, he remarked he found Tehaʼamana herself impenetrable, thus perhaps the Mona Lisa expression he gives her in the portrait.

The portrait is closely based on a charcoal study and, taken together with the unduly short proportions of the arms, suggests the portrait may not have been painted directly from the model.

== Other portraits ==
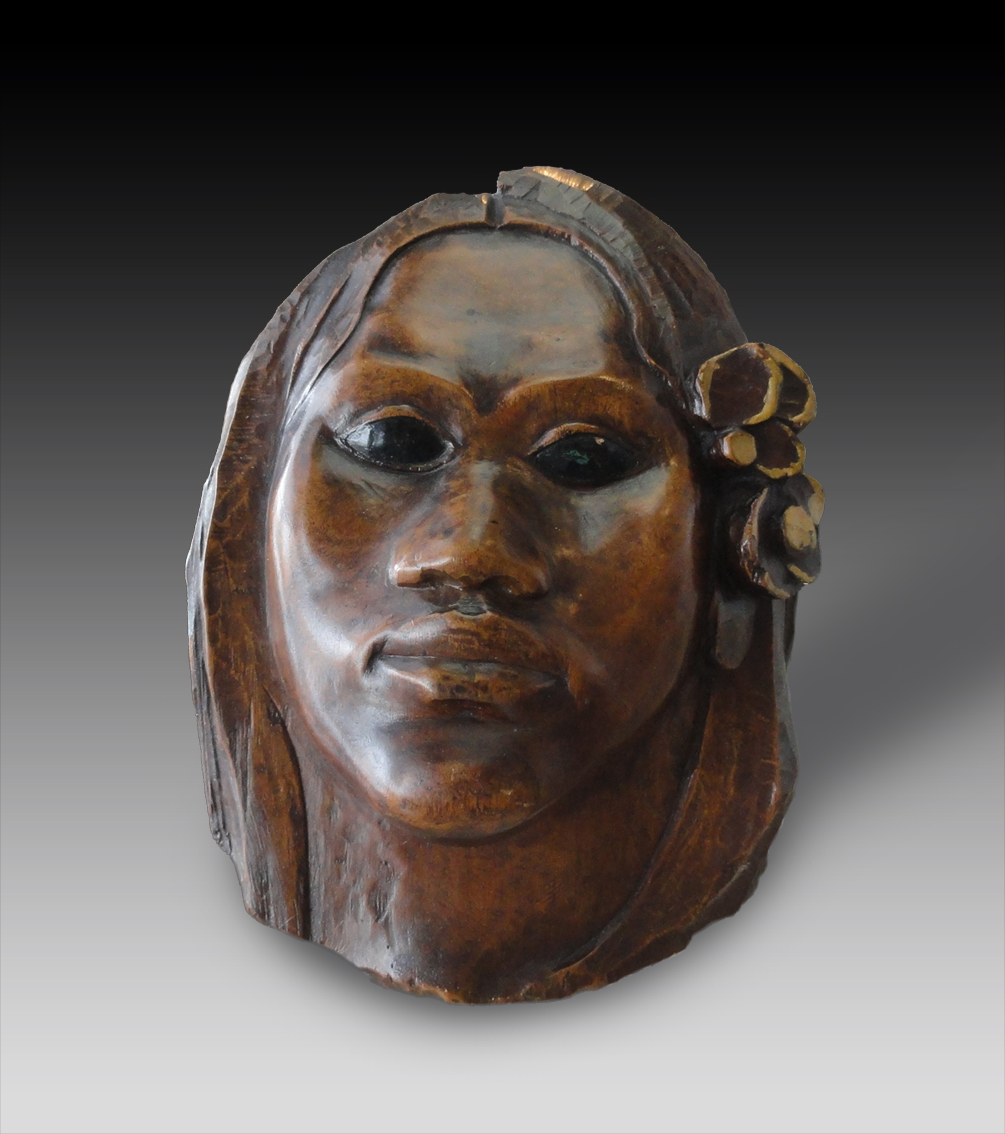
Sculpted head, wood carving, circa 1892, Musée d'Orsay, Paris

The only other portrait known certainly to be of Tehaʼamana is a sculpted head in the form of a hollow mask in the Musée d'Orsay, titled Head of a Tahitian Woman. The wood carving is curious because it carries a roughly hewn figure of Eve on its inside. Stuckey suggests this is a reference to the Edenic paradise Gauguin said he had found with Tehaʼamana, but also observes that Gauguin had questioned her fidelity in his Noa Noa account and suggests the figure might also represent fantasies on Tehaʼamana's part as Eve the temptress, the green eyes of the polychromed head perhaps signifying jealousy.

== References and sources ==
Sources

- Danielsson, Bengt (1965). Gauguin in the South Seas. New York: Doubleday and Company.
- Danielsson, Bengt (1975). Gauguin à Tahiti et aux îles Marquises (in French). Agora. ISBN 2-266-02727-1.
- Gauguin, Paul; Morice, Charles (1901). Noa Noa: The Tahiti Journal of Paul Gauguin.
- Mathews, Nancy Mowll (2001). Paul Gauguin, an Erotic Life. New Haven, Connecticut: Yale University Press, ISBN 0-300-09109-5.
- Pollock, Griselda. Avant-Garde Gambits: Gender and the Colour of Art History, London: Thames and Hudson, 1993.
- Solomon-Godeau, Abigail. Going Native, Paul Gauguin and the Invention of the Primitivist Modernist. The Expanding Discourse: Feminism and Art History. 1st ed. Boulder, CO: WestView, 1992. 313-329
- Stuckey, Charles F. (1988). "The First Tahitian Years". The Art of Paul Gauguin. with Peter Zegers. National Gallery of Art. pp. 224–5, 273–4, 288–9. ISBN 0-8212-1723-2. LCCN 88-81005.
- Thomson, Belinda (1987). Gauguin. London: Thames and Hudson. ISBN 0-500-20220-6.
- Taylor, Sue. "Oviri: Gauguin's savage woman". Journal of Art History, Volume 62, Issue 3/4, 1993. 197–220.
- Wadley, Nicholas (1985). Noa Noa: Gauguin's Tahiti, London: Phaidon Press. ISBN 0-7148-2375-9.
