= Spirit of the Dead Watching =

1892 painting by Paul Gauguin

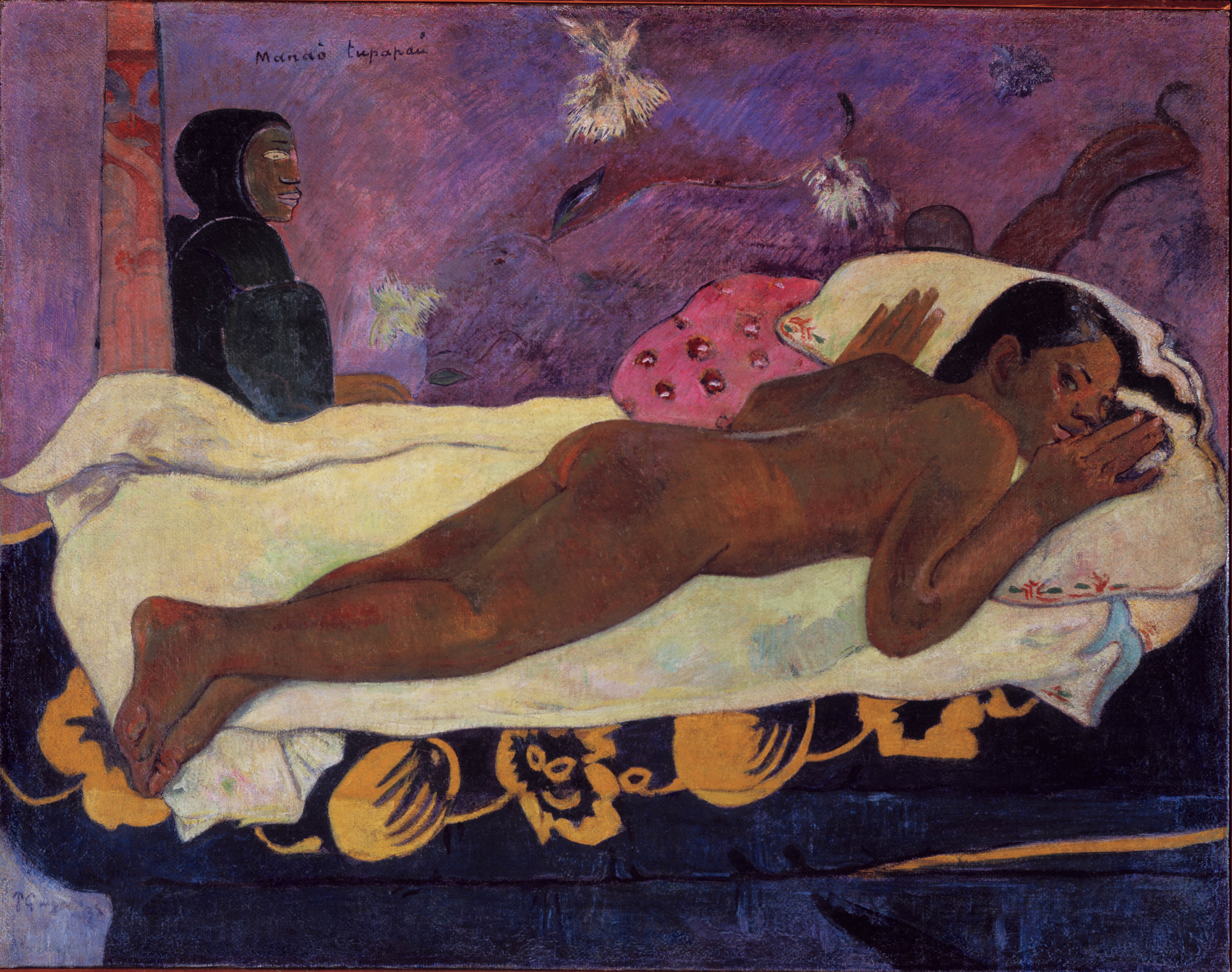
- Artist: Paul Gauguin
- Year: 1892
- Medium: Oil on canvas
- Dimensions: 116.05 cm × 134.62 cm (45.6 in × 53 in)
- Location: Buffalo AKG Art Museum, Buffalo

Spirit of the Dead Watching (Manao tupapau) is an 1892 oil on burlap canvas painting by Paul Gauguin, depicting a nude Tahitian girl lying on her stomach. An old woman is seated behind her. Gauguin said the title may refer to either the girl imagining the ghost, or the ghost imagining her. (Note: The remark about the double meaning of the title comes from Cahier pour Aline. Danielsson points out that the title cannot have the double meaning Gauguin attributed to it because it written in pidgin Tahitian consisting simply of two root words, thought and spirit, without any connective.)

== Subject ==
The subject of the painting is Gauguin's 13-year-old child-wife Tehaʼamana (called Tehura in his letters), who one night, according to Gauguin, was lying in fear when he arrived home late: "immobile, naked, lying face downward flat on the bed with the eyes inordinately large with fear [...] Might she not with my frightened face take me for one of the demons and specters, one of the Tupapaus, with which the legends of her race people sleepless nights?" Gauguin was suffering from advanced venereal disease when he came to Tahiti, and he passed it on to Tehaʼamana, who was his first sexual partner on the island.

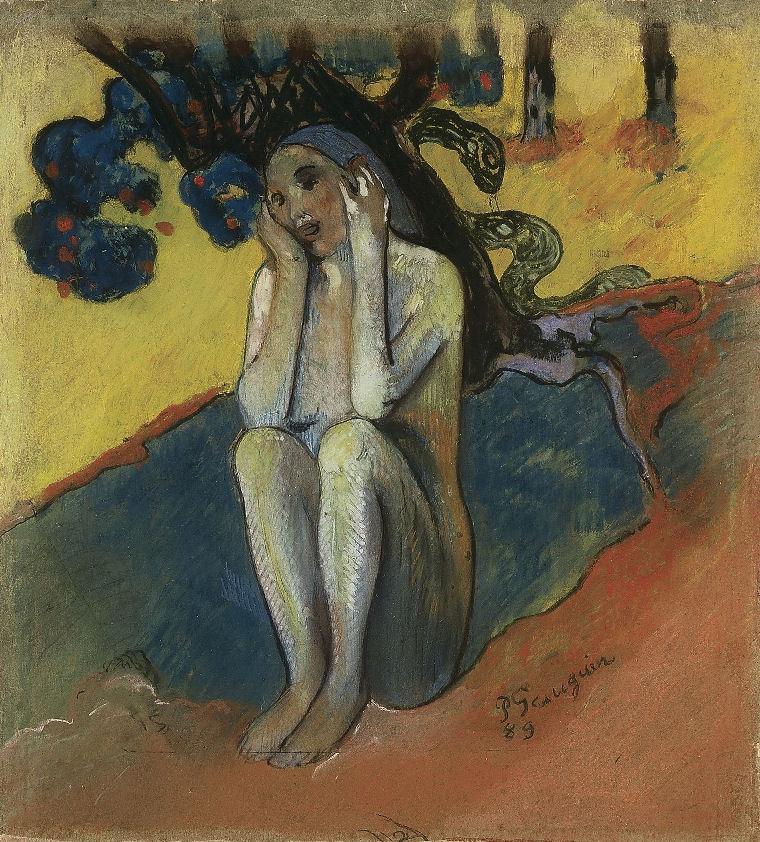
Breton Eve, 1889, McNay Art Museum

Art historian Nancy Mowll Mathews says the painting is a direct descendant of a previous series of "frightened Eves" that Gauguin painted from 1889. His 1889 Breton Eve, shown at the Volpini exhibition of 1889, represented Eve as in fear of the snake, reinterpreting the traditional Christian theme of innocence before the fall. In his letter of 8 December 1892 to his wife Mette (famously neglecting to mention that the girl in question was his lover), he says "I painted a nude of a young girl. In this position she is on the verge of being indecent. But I want it that way: the lines and movement are interesting to me. And so, I give her, in depicting the head, a bit of a fright." He then needed to find a pretext for the girl's emotions. At first (in his letter to Mette) Gauguin made the old woman the subject of her fright, but later in his account in Noa Noa made himself the subject of her fear. Mathews says it is too simple to attribute Tehura's terror to her belief in spirits and irrational fear of the dark; she says, following Sweetman, that Gauguin's sexual predilections should not be ignored when trying to understand the work. Rather, she suggests the girl's fear was a response to Gauguin's aggressive behavior, consistent with his known physical abuse of his wife Mette, the submissive fear in her eyes his erotic reward.

Mathews also draws a connection to Gauguin's homoerotic sensibilities. Gauguin's travel narrative Noa Noa describes an episode where he went hiking with a young, handsome man and felt overcome with desire as, in his words, "with the suppleness of an animal and the graceful litheness of an androgyne he walked a few paces in advance of me", only for the spell to be broken when they saw each other face to face and the androgynous quality disappeared. In this painting, conversely, the girl is made more androgynous by being shown from the back, and the focus is on the buttocks where a stroke of orange paint "calls attention to the point of entry between them."

Stephen F. Eisenman, professor of Art History at Northwestern University, suggests the painting and its narrative is "a veritable encyclopaedia of colonial racism and misogyny". Eisenman's book Gauguin's Skirt challenges conventional notions of the political and gender content of Gauguin's paintings. In Spirit he sees parallels not only with Manet's Olympia (see below), but also with the Louvre Hermaphrodite in the boyishness of the features and the a tergo posture. The androgynous depiction is in keeping with Polynesian cosmology and its stress on the dual nature of things.

Other historians such as Naomi E. Maurer have viewed the narrative as a device to make the indecency of the subject more acceptable to a European audience.

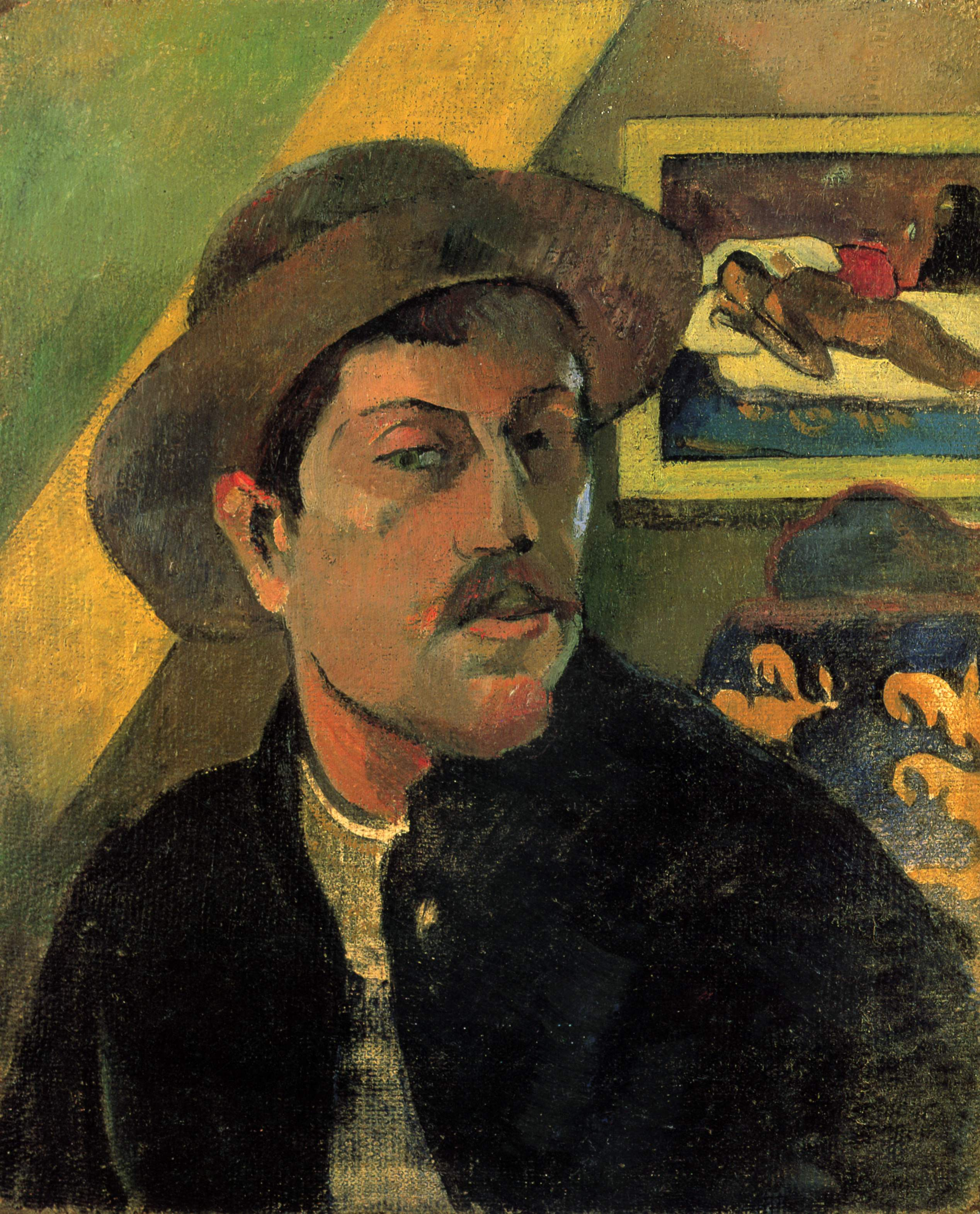
Paul Gauguin, Self-portrait, 1893. Gauguin's self-portrait of 1893, with Spirit of the Dead Watching in the background.

The painting appears (as a mirror image) in the background of another Gauguin painting, his Self-portrait with Hat, indicating the importance he attached to it.

== Relation to Édouard Manet's Olympia ==
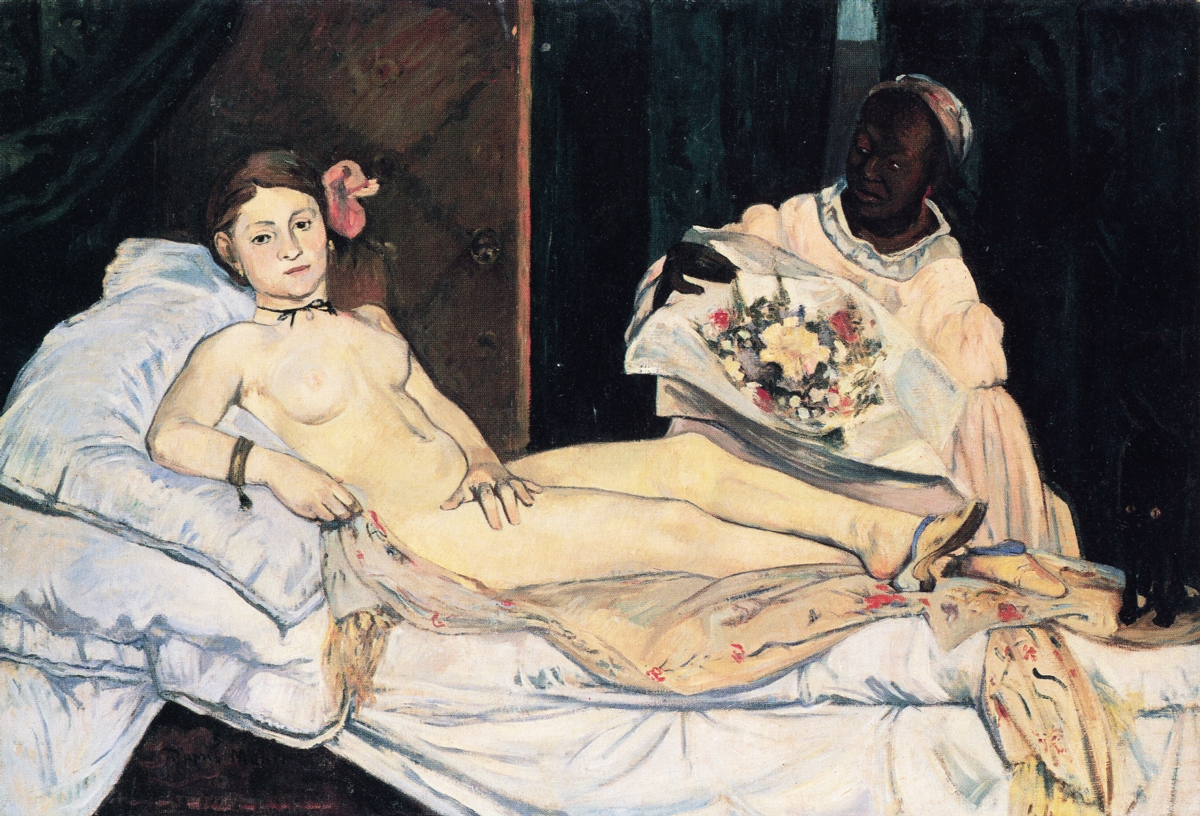
Copy of Manet's Olympia, 1891.

Gauguin was an admirer of Édouard Manet's 1863 Olympia. He had seen it exhibited at the 1889 Exposition Universelle and commented in a review, "La Belle Olympia, who once caused such a scandal, is esconced there like the pretty woman she is, and draws not a few appreciative glances". After the French state purchased Olympia from Manet's widow, with funds from a public subscription organised by Claude Monet, Gauguin took the opportunity to make a three-quarter size copy when it was exhibited in the Musée du Luxembourg. The copy is not an especially faithful one and it is thought he completed it from a photograph. Edgar Degas later purchased it for 230 francs at Gauguin's 1895 auction of his paintings to raise funds for his return to Tahiti. It is known that Gauguin took a photograph of Manet's Olympia with him on his first visit to Tahiti. Claire Frèches-Thory remarks that Olympia, the modern equivalent of Titian's Venus of Urbino, is a constant presence in Gauguin's great nudes of the South Pacific: Spirit of the Dead Watching, Te arii vahine, and Nevermore.

When Gauguin exhibited Spirit of the Dead Watching at his largely unsuccessful 1893 Durand-Ruel exhibition (in particular he failed to sell Spirit at the elevated 3,000 francs he had set for it), several critics noted the compositional similarities with Olympia. Thadée Natanson, a founder of La Revue Blanche, called it the "Olympia of Tahiti", while Alfred Jarry, more pointedly, dubbed it "the brown Olympia".

=== Griselda Pollock's Avant-Garde Gambits ===
In the 1992 Walter Neurath Memorial Lecture, published as Avant-Garde Gambits 1888-1893: Gender and the Colour of Art History, the feminist art historian Griselda Pollock examines the problems faced by a white art historian in writing an art history that recognises the historical subjectivity of a woman of colour such as Tehaʼamana, known otherwise to art history only by her representations within the discourses of masculinity and colonial imperialism. (Note: Eisenman notes that Gauguin's later writing on women comprised an odd and contradictory record of both feminism and masculinism. His views rejecting the sanctity of the family that he expressed in his unpublished 1902 pamphlet on Catholicism mirrored those of his feminist grandmother Flora Tristan.) She attempts this by concentrating on a detailed reading of a single painting, the Spirit of the Dead Watching, advancing a new theory of avant-gardism as a kind of game-play involving first reference, then deference, and finally difference. In this case the object of reference is Manet's Olympia, the deference was to Manet as leader of the avant-garde treatment of the nude, and the difference (amongst other matters) was the colour of the subject and the role of the second figure in the painting, the whole a gambit by which Gauguin hoped to usurp Manet's place in the avant-garde.

Pollock notes a structural correspondence between the two paintings. In Spirit of the Dead Watching, a viewer for the scene is invoked by Tehaʼamana's gaze on the bed, a viewer for whom Gauguin has to invent a narrative, while in Olympia the implied narrative is that of prostitution, as critics of the time such as Emile Zola clearly recognised.

In Gauguin's final version of his narrative, as published in Noa Noa, he makes the second subject of his painting, the spectre, a surrogate spectator within the painting, and then (with Tehaʼamana's gaze) relocates and displaces Tehaʼamana's fear and paranoia on him, the intruder. Thus, by formal reference to Manet's Olympia, Gaughin has reintroduced himself, taking his place in the avant-garde as artist, as owner, and as colonist.

== Commentary by Gauguin ==
There are five sources for Gauguin's description of the painting: a letter to his patron Daniel Monfreid dated 8 December 1892, another letter to his wife Mette the same day, his 1893 manuscript Cahier pour Aline ("Notebook for Aline"), the first unpublished 1893-4 draft of Noa Noa and then finally the published 1901 version prepared together with his collaborator Charles Morice. Richard Field has provided a critical analysis of these sources.

Letter to Daniel Monfreid

In an 8 December 1892 letter to Daniel Monfreid, Gauguin gives the titles of eight paintings he is sending out for exhibition in Copenhagen. He translates the title Manao tupapau as "Think of the Ghost, or, The Spirits of the Dead are Watching" and goes on to say that he wants to reserve it for a later sale, but will sell for 2,000 francs. He describes the painting as follows (without explaining the subject is a nude):

This picture is for me (excellent). Here is the genesis (for you only). General Harmony. Dark dull violet, dark blue and chrome. 1. The draperies are chrome 2. because this colour suggests night, without explaining it however, and furthermore serves as a happy medium between the yellow orange and the green, completing the harmony. These flowers are also like phosphorescences in the night (in her thoughts). The Kanakas believe that the phosphorous lights seen at night are the souls of the dead.

In short, it is a fine bit of painting, although it is not according to nature.

Paintings from Gauguin's first Tahitian period selected for his Copenhagen exhibition

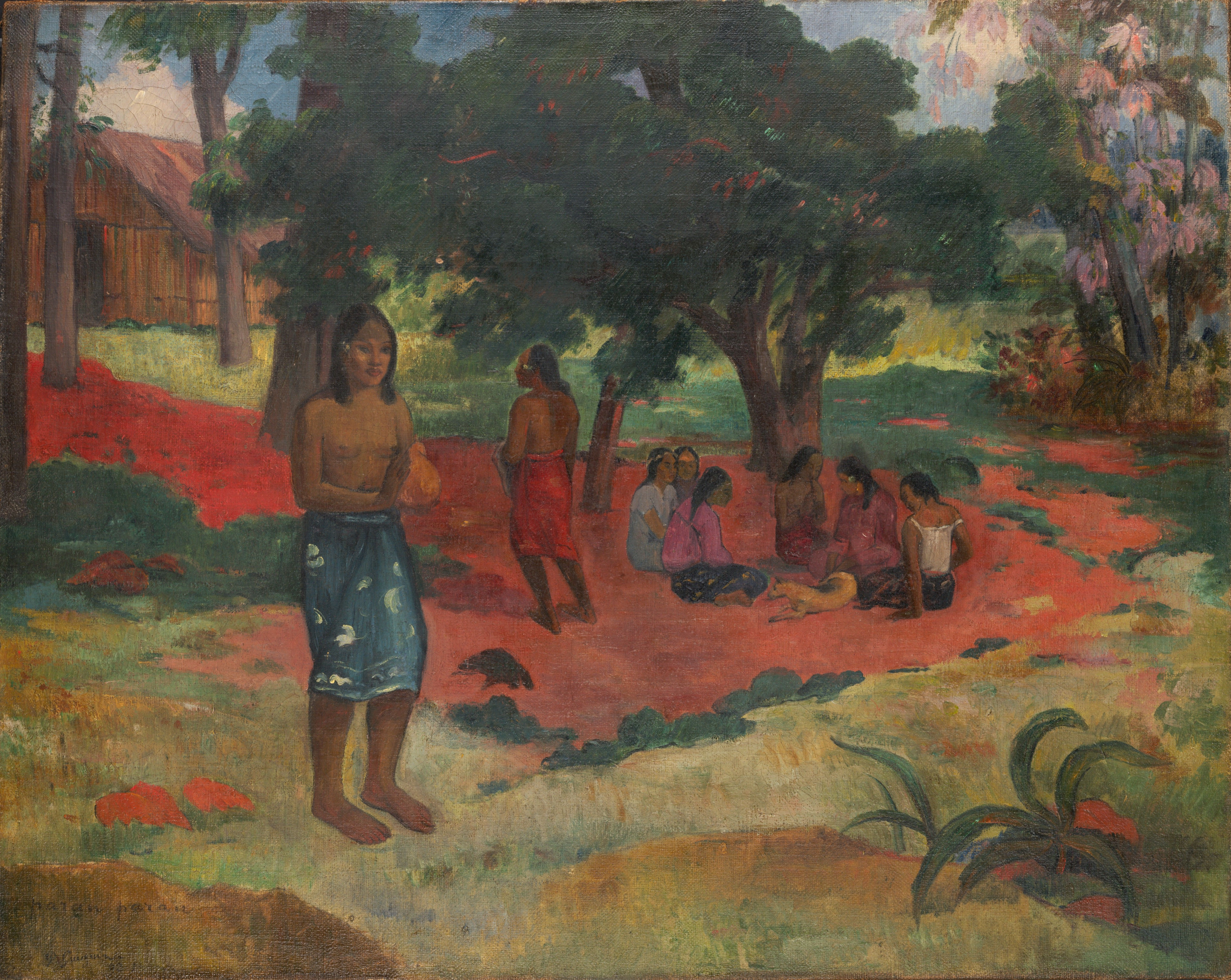

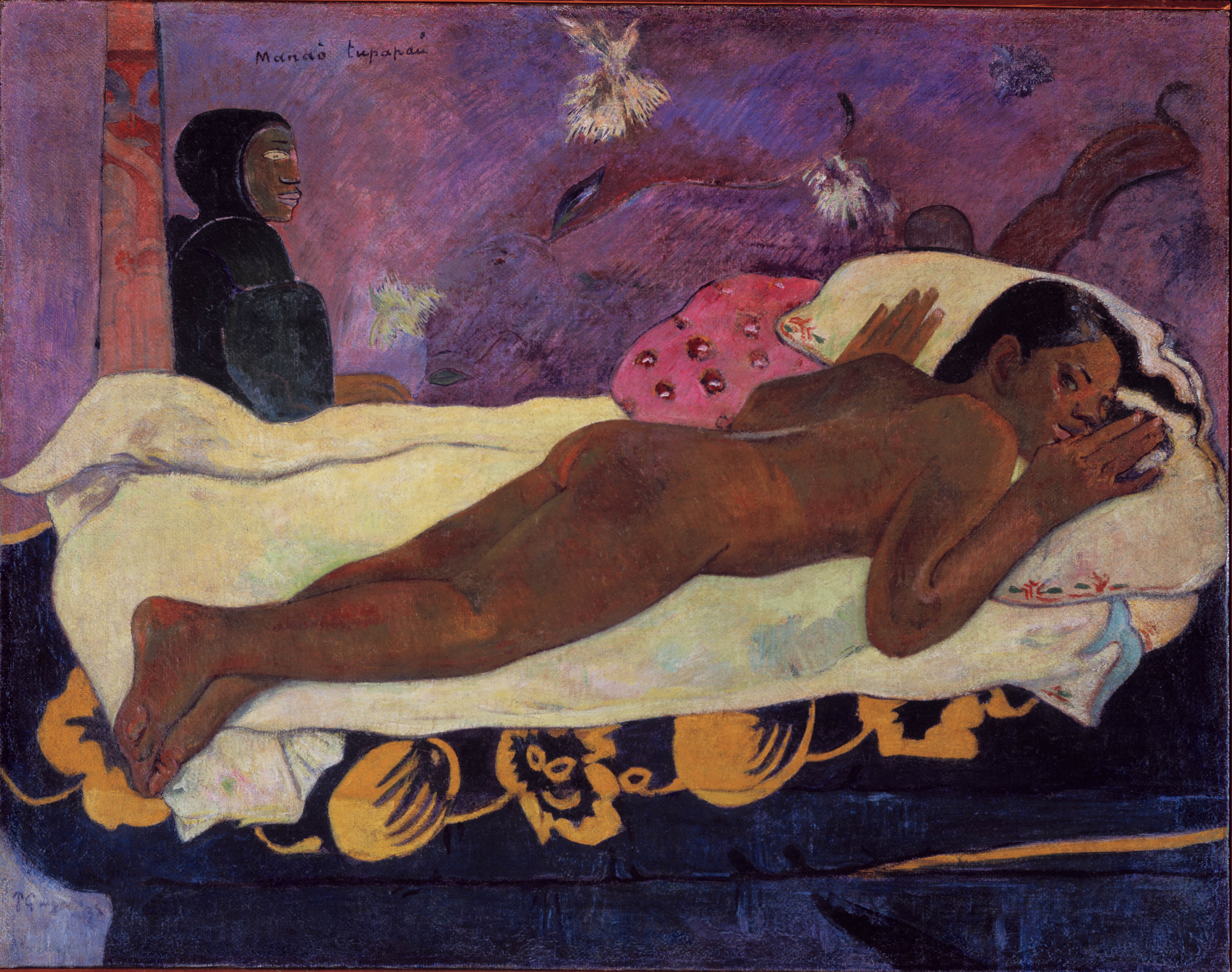

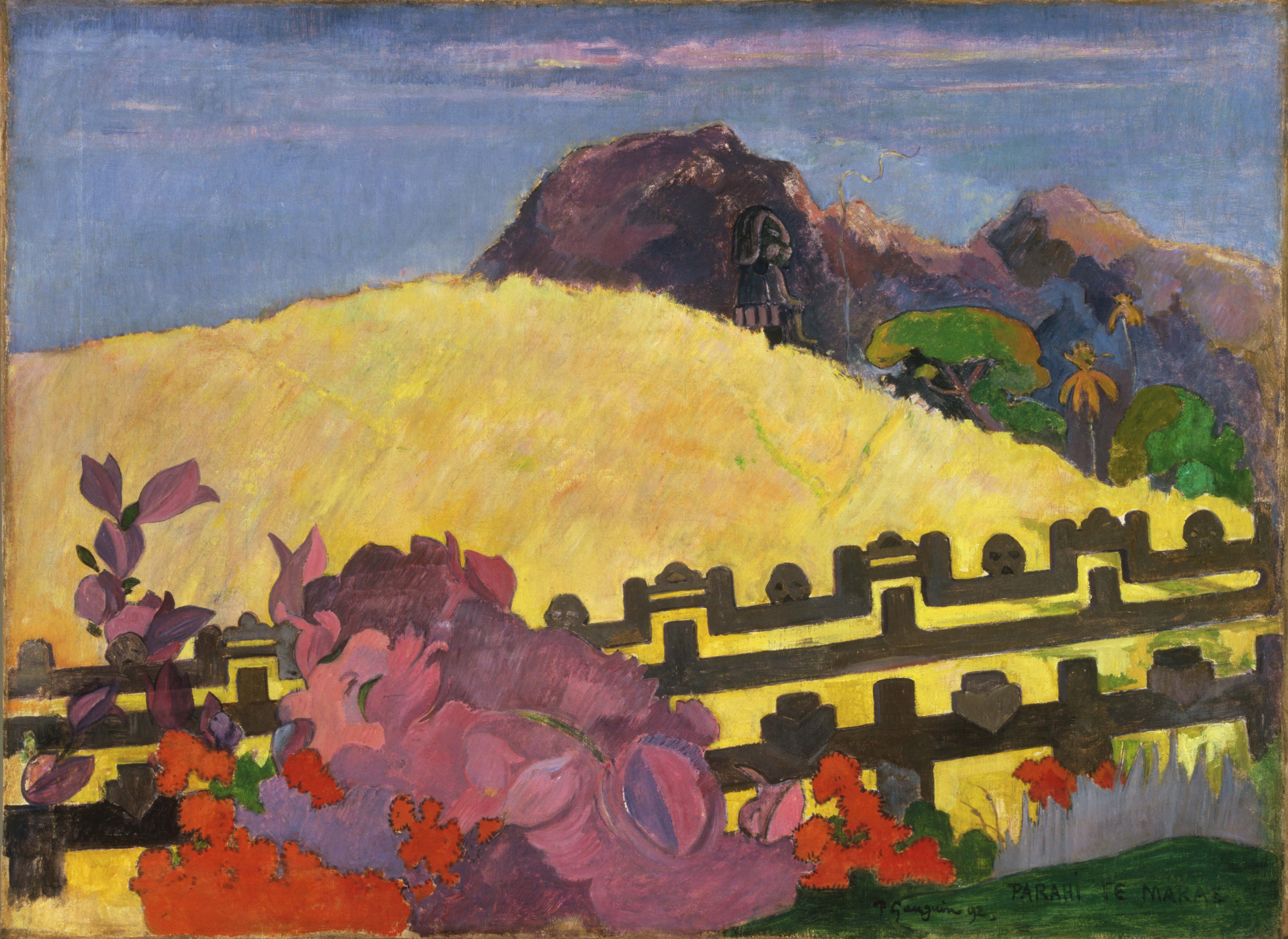

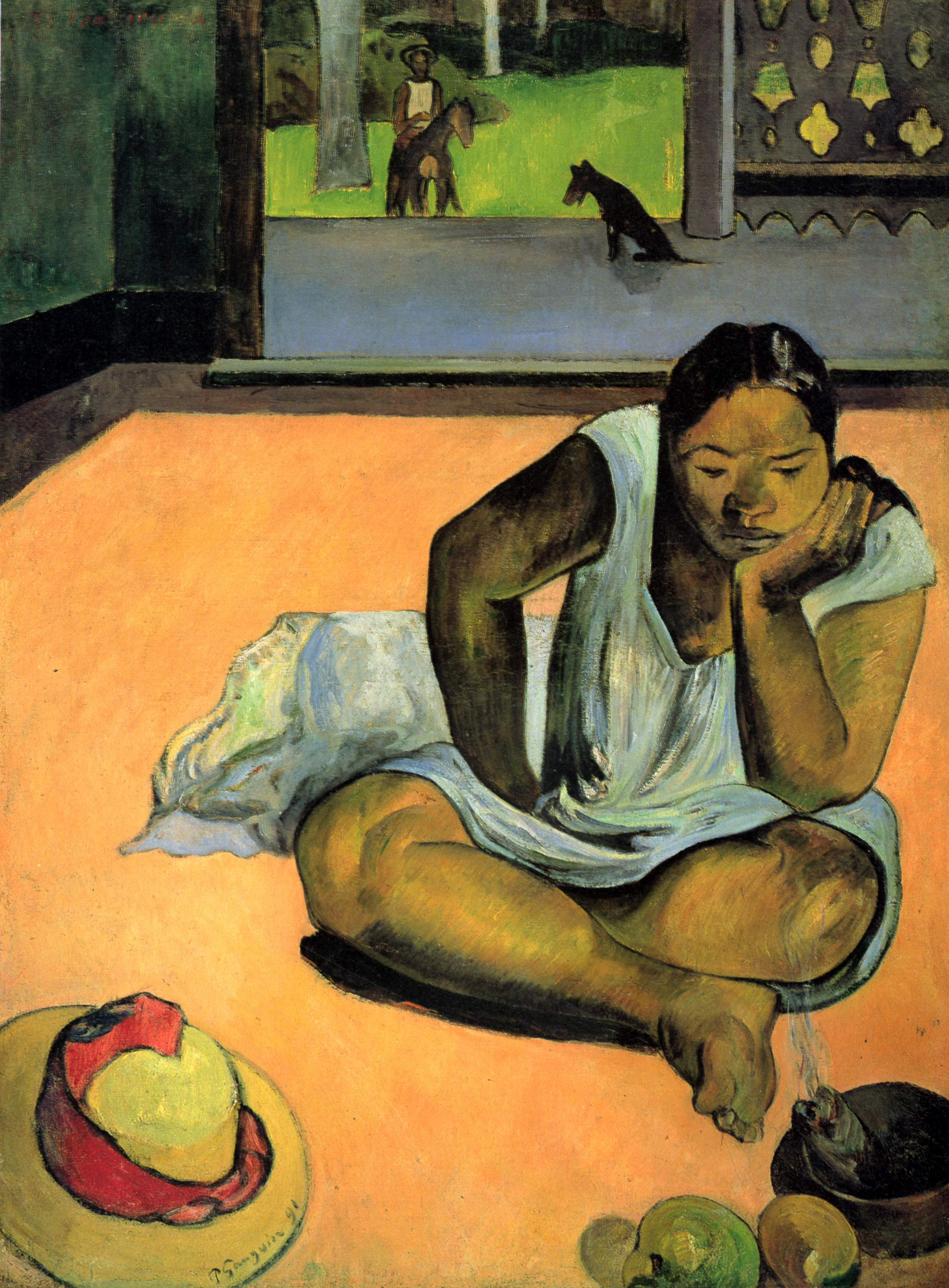

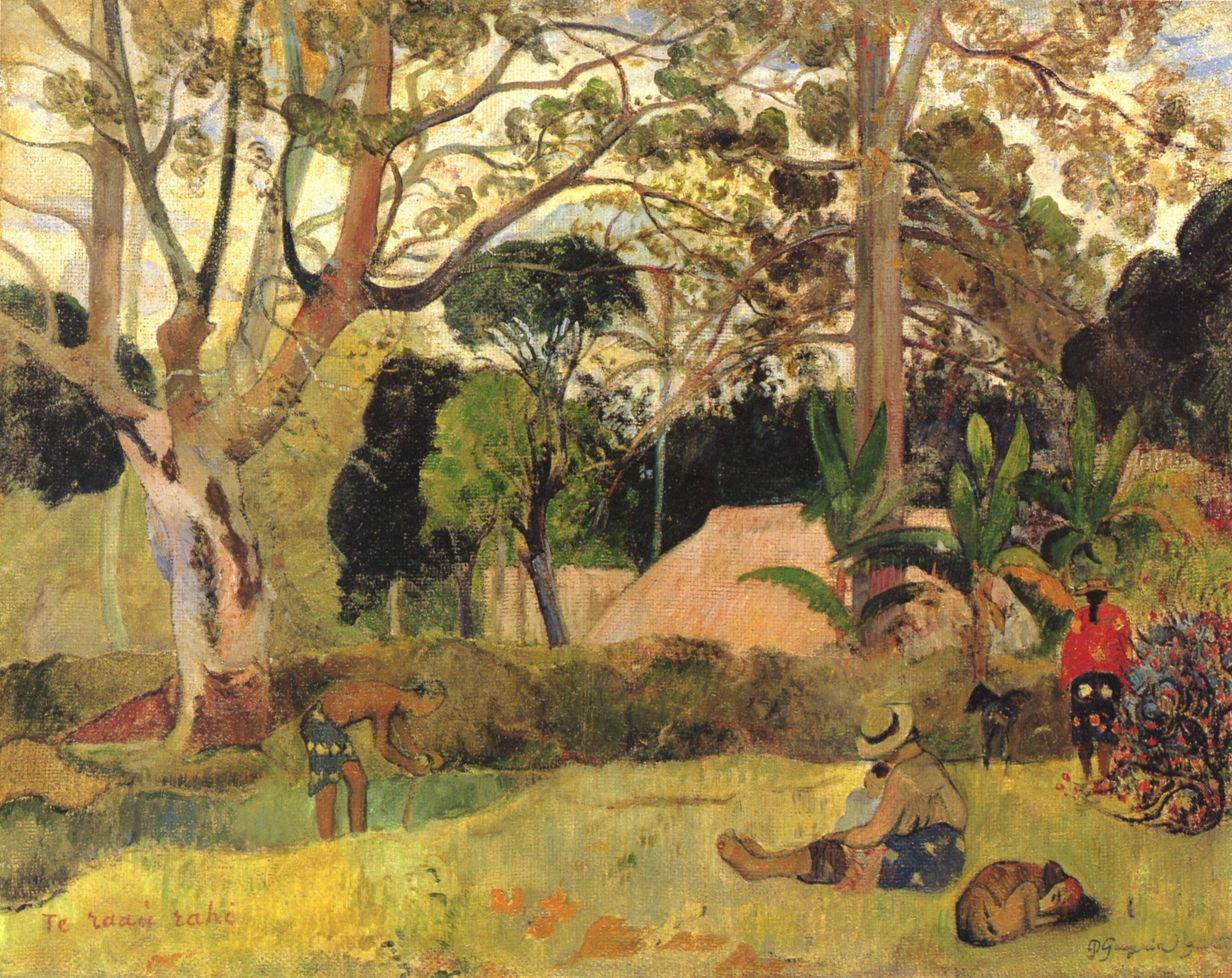

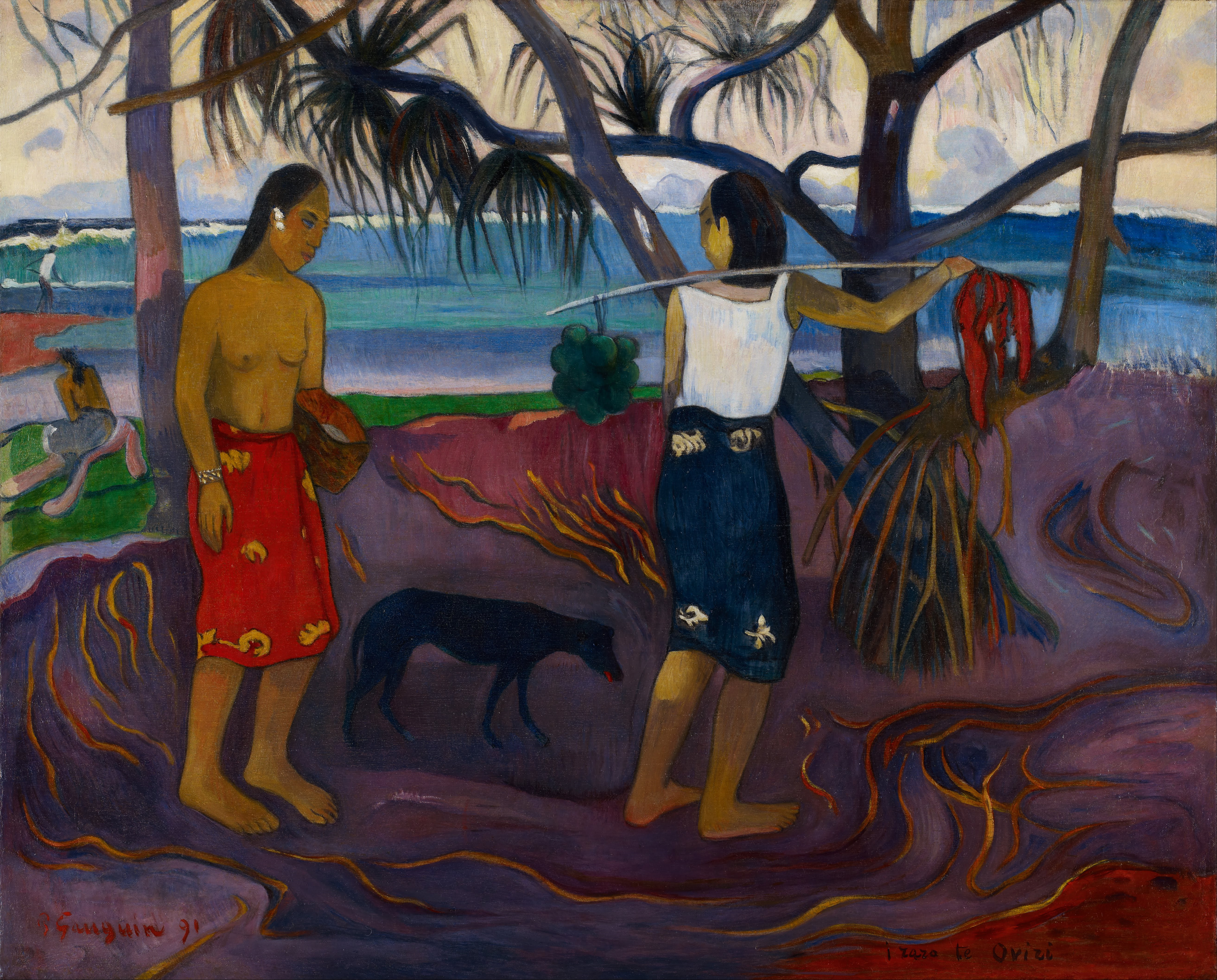

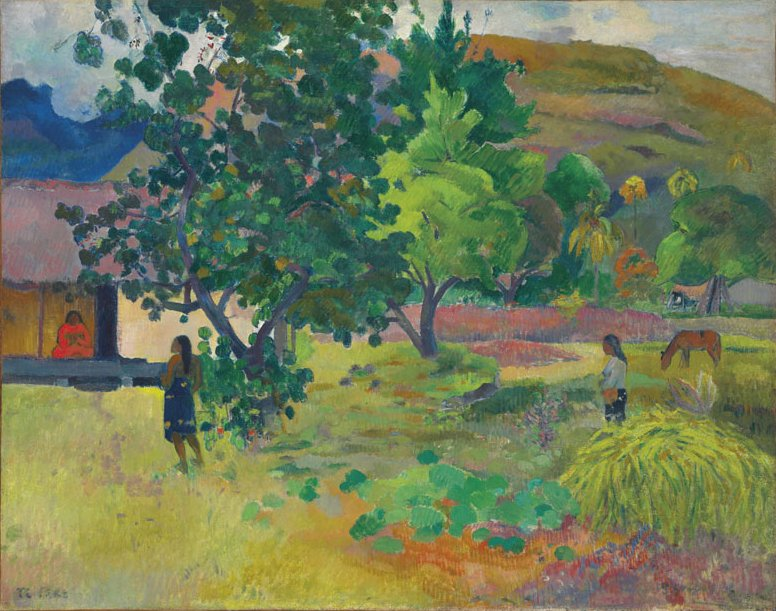

Letter to Mette Gauguin

In an 8 December 1892 letter to his wife, Gauguin gives translations of the Tahitian titles of the paintings he intends to send. He stresses this is for Mette's eyes only, so that she can provide them for those who ask for them. He fixes a price of at least 1,500 francs for the painting, and goes on to describe it as follows:

I painted a nude of a young girl. In this position she is on the verge of being indecent. But I want it that way: the lines and movement are interesting to me. And so, I give her, in depicting the head, a bit of a fright. It is necessary to justify this fright if not to explain it because it is in the character of a Maori person. Traditionally these people have a great fear of the spirits of the dead. One of our own young girls [in Europe] would be frightened to be caught in this position. (The women here would not.) I have to explain this fright with the least possible literary means as was done formerly. So I did this. General harmony, somber, sad, frightening, telling in the eye like a funeral knell. Violet, somber blue, and orange-yellow. I make the linen greenish-yellow: 1 because the linen of this savage is a different linen than ours (beaten tree bark); 2 because it creates, suggests artificial light (the Kanaka woman never sleeps in darkness) and yet I don't want the effect of a lamp (it is common); 3 this yellow linking the orange-yellow and the blue completes the musical harmony. There are several flowers in the background, but they should not be real, being imaginative, I make them resemble sparks. For the Kanaka, the phosphorescences of the night are from the spirit of the dead, they believe they are there and fear them. Finally, to end, I make the ghost quite simply, a little old woman; because the young girl, unacquainted with the spirits of the French stage, could not visualise death except in the form of a person like herself. There you have the script that will prepare you for the critics when they bombard you with their malicious questions. To conclude, the painting had to be made very simple, the motif being savage, childlike

According to Gauguin, the phosphorescences that could be seen in Tahiti at night, and which natives believed to be the exhalations of the spirits of the dead, were emitted by mushrooms that grew on trees. The description of the spirit of the dead that the artist would have been familiar with came from the work of Pierre Loti, who described the spirit as a "blue-faced monster with sharp fangs"; the decision to paint an old woman instead of a bizarre demon may have been prompted by the desire to use a symbol that would be more familiar to a European audience.

Cahier pour Aline

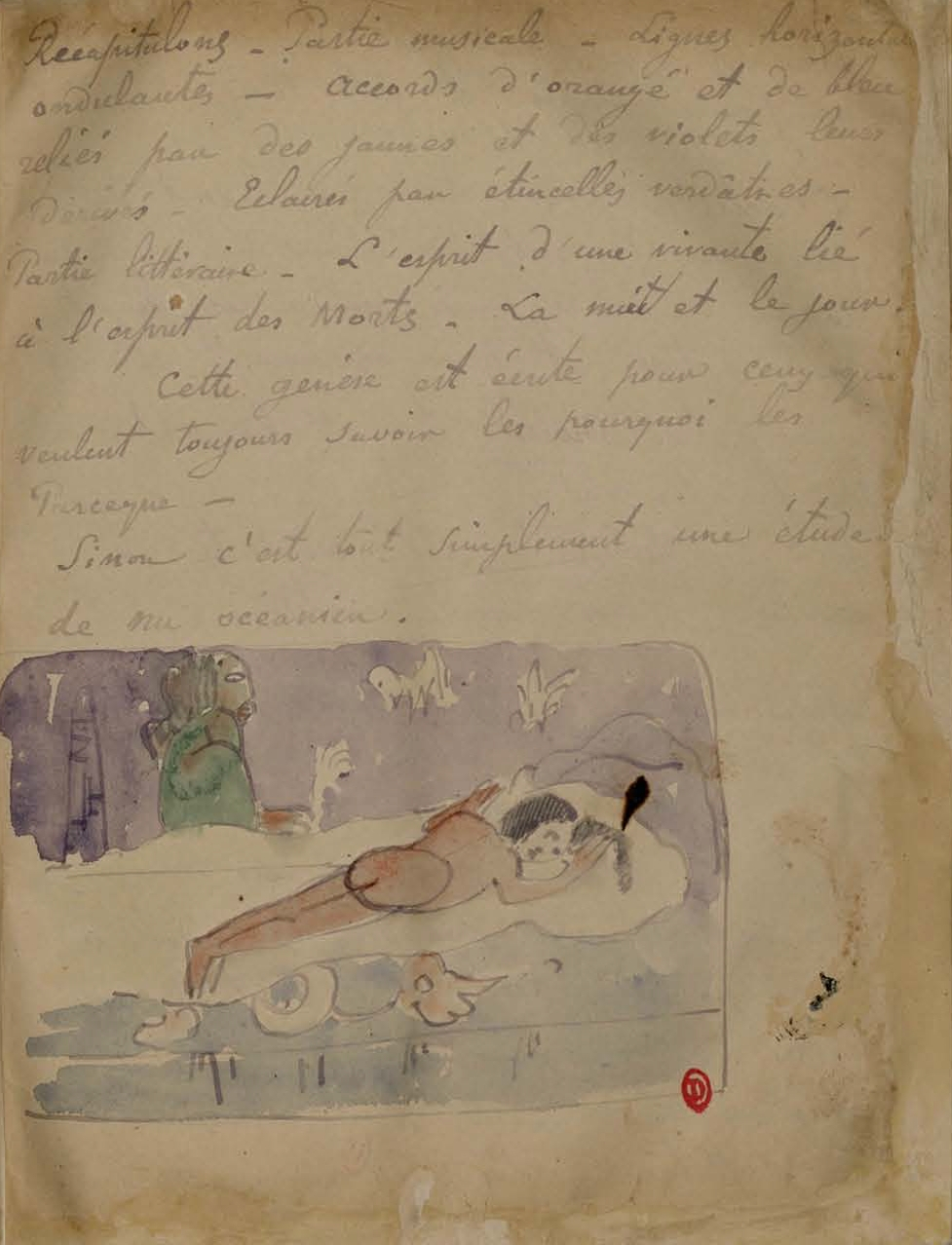
Cahier pour Aline: Genèse d'un tableau, 1893, Bibliothèque de l'Institut National d'Histoire de l'Art, Paris

Gauguin began this notebook in 1893 for his eldest daughter Aline, then sixteen years old, during his first visit to Tahiti. Unfortunately she died in 1897 from pneumonia before she could receive it. The notebook includes a description of the painting, under the title Genèse d'un tableau ("Genesis of a picture"), accompanied by a watercolor sketch. It is here that Gauguin remarked the title Manao tupapau can be understood in two ways:

In this rather daring position, quite naked on a bed, what might a young Kanaka girl be doing? Preparing for love? This is indeed in her character, but it is indecent and I do not want that. Sleeping, after the act of love? But that is still indecent. The only possible thing is fear. What kind of fear? Certainly not the fear of Susannah surprised by the Elders. That does not happen in Oceania. The tupapau is just the thing... According to Tahitian beliefs, the title Manao tupapau has a double meaning... either she thinks of the ghost or the ghost thinks of her. To recapitulate: Musical part - undulating horizontal lines - harmonies in orange and blue linked by yellows and violets, from which they derive. The light and the greenish sparks. Literary part - the spirit of a living girl linked with the spirit of Death. Night and Day. This genèse is written for those who always have to know the whys and wherefores. Otherwise the picture is simply a study of a Polynesian nude.

Noa Noa

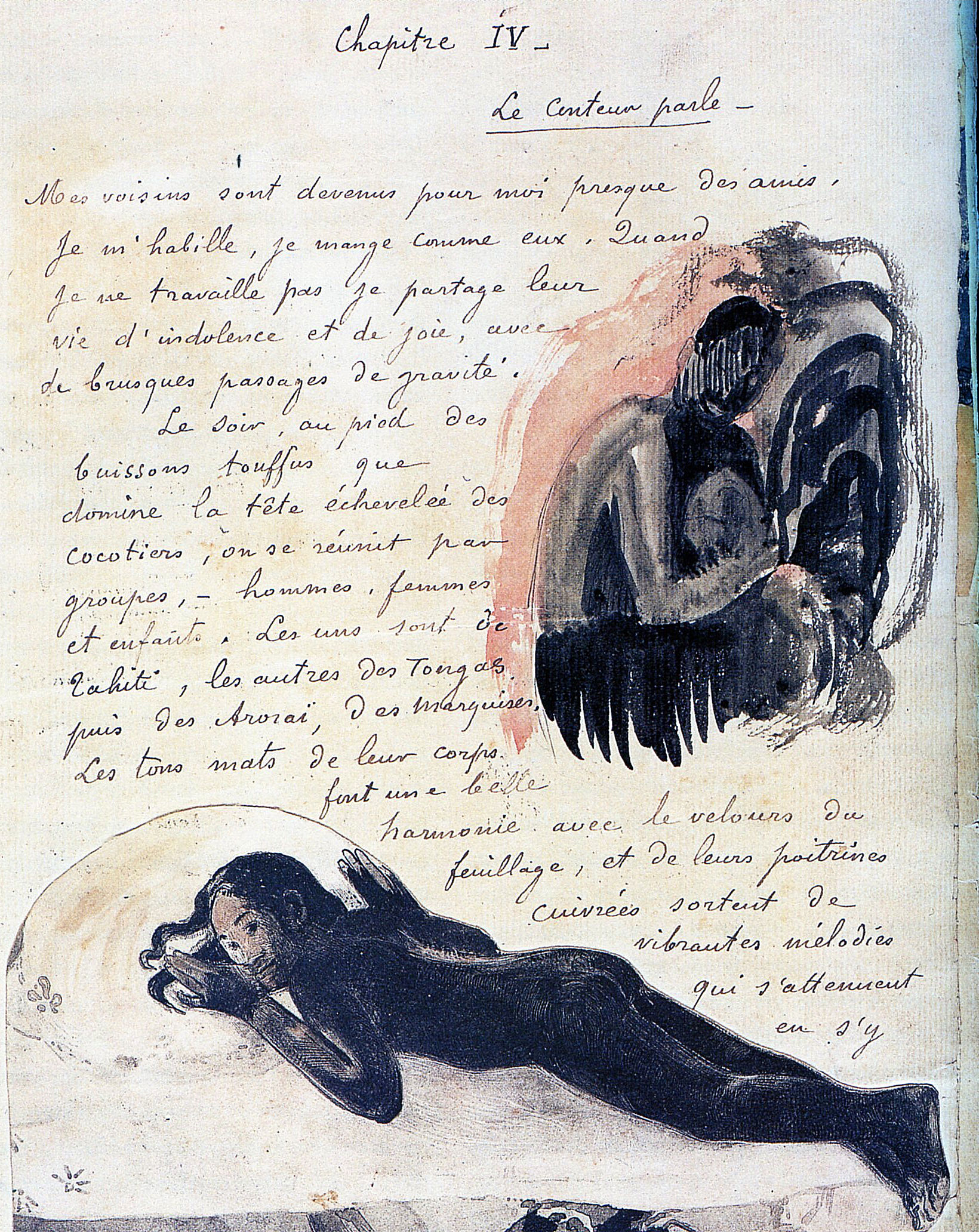
Le Conteur Parle (Louvre manuscript), 1893–97, Louvre

Noa Noa was originally conceived as a travelogue to accompany Gauguin's 1893 Durand-Ruel exhibition. Gauguin wrote the first rough draft (now in the Getty Center) in 1893 but could not complete it in time. He subsequently entered into a collaboration with the Symbolist poet Charles Morice to produce a more elaborate and imaginative work. The manuscript for this, prepared between 1893 and 1897, is now in the Louvre. Extracts, including those dealing with the painting, were published in 1897 in the La Revue Blanche, while the whole work was finally published at Morice's expense, Gauguin having essentially lost interest, in 1901 in the La Plume edition.

In the draft account, Gauguin describes coming home late to find Tehaʼamana lying on her bed in the dark. This was to be followed by a description of the painting he never inserted. Finally he records Tehaʼamana chiding Gauguin for leaving her in the dark:

One day I had to go to Papeete. I had promised to come back that same evening. On the way back the carriage broke down half way: I had to do the rest on foot. It was one in the morning when I got home. Having at that moment very little oil in the house - my stock was to be replenished - the lamp had gone out, and the room was in darkness when I went in. I felt afraid and, more still, mistrustful. Surely the bird has flown. I struck matches and saw on the bed

(Description of the picture Tupapau)

The poor child came to herself again and I did all I could to restore her confidence. 'Never leave me alone again like this without light! What have you been doing in town? - you've been to see women, the kind who go to the market to drink and dance, then give themselves to the officers, to the sailors, to everybody?'

Gauguin's account is considerably extended in the final published version. Critics agree that Morice was responsible for the expansion, albeit with the full support of Gauguin. The description of the painting, previously omitted, now commences:

Tehura lay motionless, naked, belly down on the bed: she stared up at me, her eyes wide with fear, and she seemed not to know who I was. For a moment I too felt a strange uncertainty. Tehura's dread was contagious: it seemed to me that a phosphorescent light poured from her staring eyes. I had never seen her so lovely; above all I had never seen her beauty so moving. And in the half-shadow, which no doubt seethed with dangerous apparitions and ambiguous shapes, I feared to make the slightest move in case the child should be terrified out of her mind. Did I know what she thought I was, in that instant? Perhaps she took me, with my anguished face, for one of those legendary demons or specters, the Tupapaus that filled the sleepless nights of her people.

This final version continues, as in the draft, with the quarrel over using prostitutes in town, and then concludes with a new remark:

I would not quarrel with her, and the night was soft, soft and ardent, a night of the tropics. ...

where Morice invokes what Pollock characterizes as an imaginary Utopia whose material foundation nevertheless lay in concrete social spaces, redefined by colonialism.

Wadley comments, as essentially does Frèches-Thory, that the painting is an example of the fusion of reality and fiction in Gauguin's mature work. The two accounts of Tehura's reaction, that she was haunted by the tupapau, and that she was angrily suspicious Gauguin had been using prostitutes, likewise pose a similar confrontation between fiction and probable fact.

== Sources ==
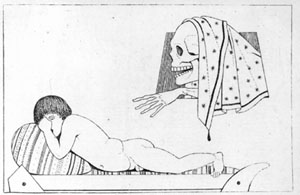
Humbert de Superville, Allegory, 1801, Leiden University Library

Two sources have been suggested for the painting.

The narrative may have been inspired by Pierre Loti's novel Madame Chrysanthème, in which the heroine, a geisha girl, is described as being tormented by night frights. The novel was very successful, and influential in shaping the Japonisme movement of the time. It is known that Gauguin read it.

A direct visual inspiration may have come from David Pierre Giottino Humbert de Superville's etching Allegory. Although there is no direct connection for the link, de Superville had been cited by Albert Aurier as one of the forerunners of Symbolist painting and de Superville's book Unconditional Signs in Art (1827–32) was widely known to that group.

== Other versions ==
Gauguin reprised the theme in a pastel (from which there are two counterproofs recorded), in a lithograph, and in several woodcuts, one of which is part of the innovative suite of woodcuts he prepared for his travelogue Noa Noa.

Pastel

The pastel is done on the reverse of a fully worked pastel study of Annah the Javanese. That study has been cut at the head, indicating that the pastel of the reclining nude was executed later and is thus a study of Anna rather than Tehaʼamana, dating from between 1894 and 1895. Art historian Richard Brettell notes the androgynous quality of the figure.

Lithograph

This was the only lithograph on stone executed by Gauguin (other 'lithographs' are in fact zincographs, i.e. transferred from zinc plates). It appeared in the 6th issue of L'Estampe originale, a journal devoted to publishing limited editions of contemporary prints.

Woodcuts

Gauguin prepared his suite of ten Noa Noa woodcuts to accompany his travelogue, but they were never published in his lifetime. The 1901 La Plume edition was planned to include them, but Gauguin declined to allow the publishers to print them on smooth paper. These woodcuts were extremely innovative, amounting to a revolution in printmaking. Also notable is the large 1894 woodcut he prepared in Brittany. This has a carving of the face and upper body of the frightened Tehaʼamana cut into the reverse of the block, one of three scenes cut into the reverse that Gauguin used to make impressions.

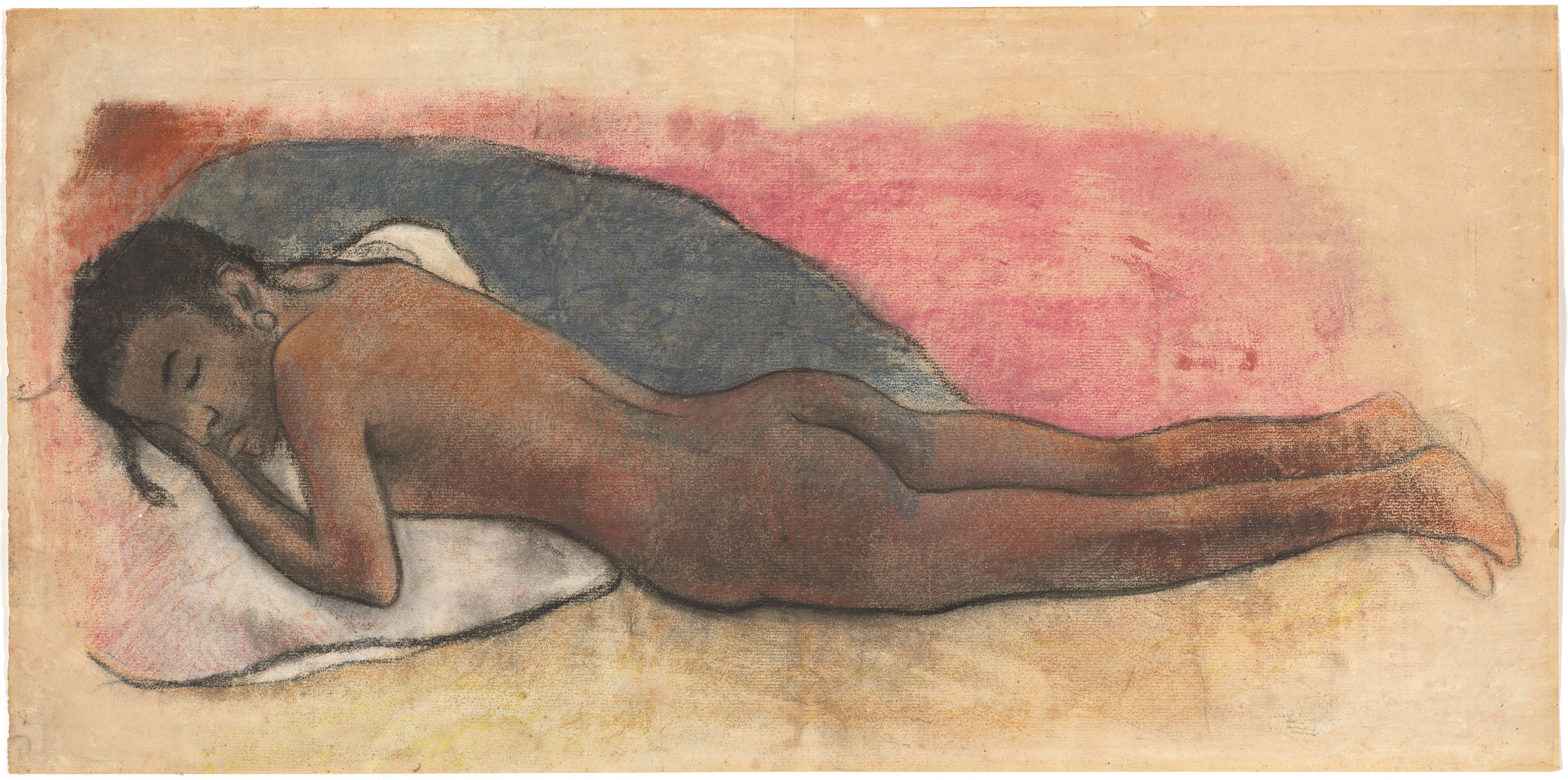
Reclining Nude, pastel, 1894–95, National Gallery of Art

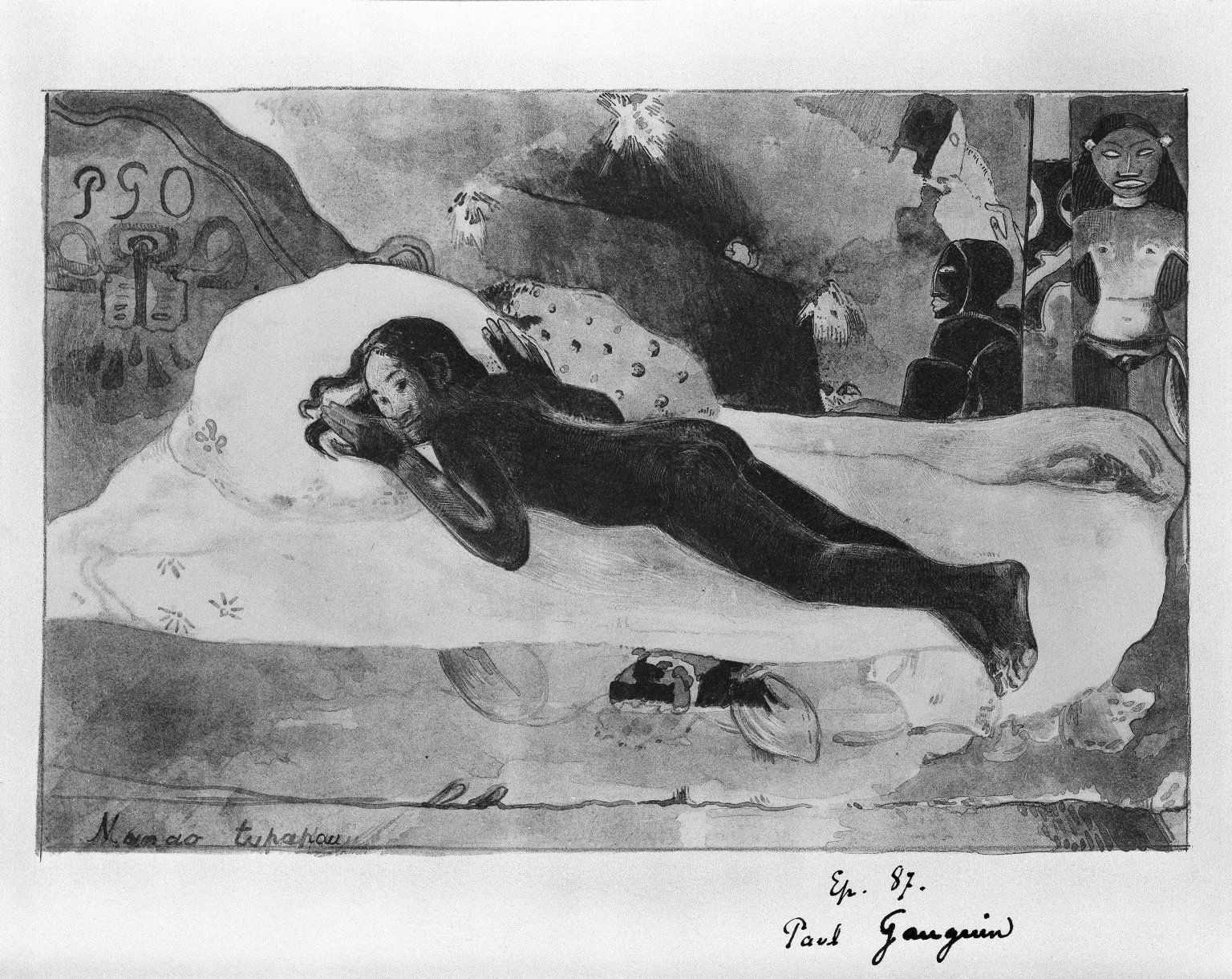
Manao Tupapau (Watched by the Spirits of the Dead), lithograph, 1894, Brooklyn Museum

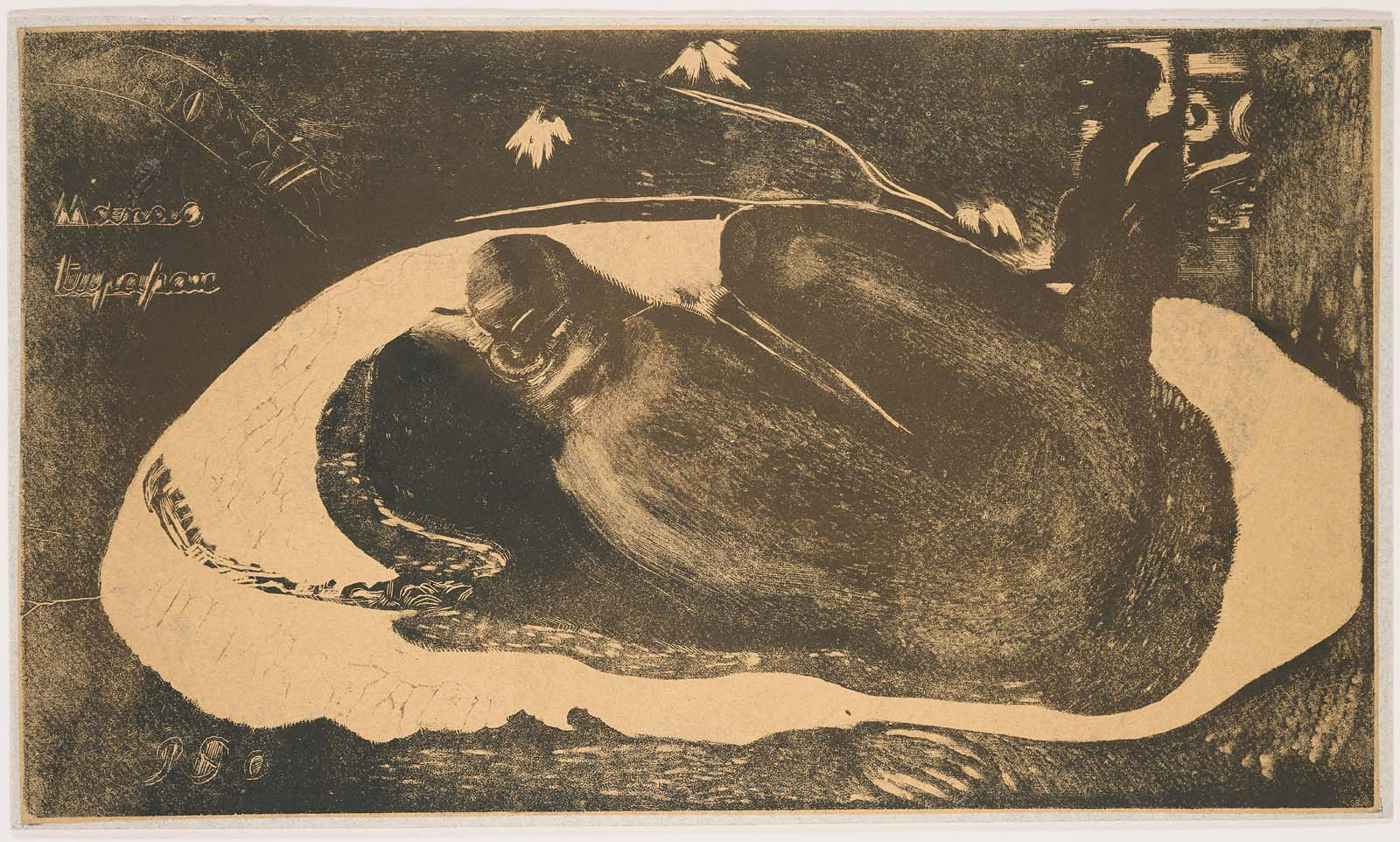
Manao Tupapau (The Spirit of the Dead Watching), woodcut (Noa Noa suite), 1893–94, Museum of Fine Arts, Boston

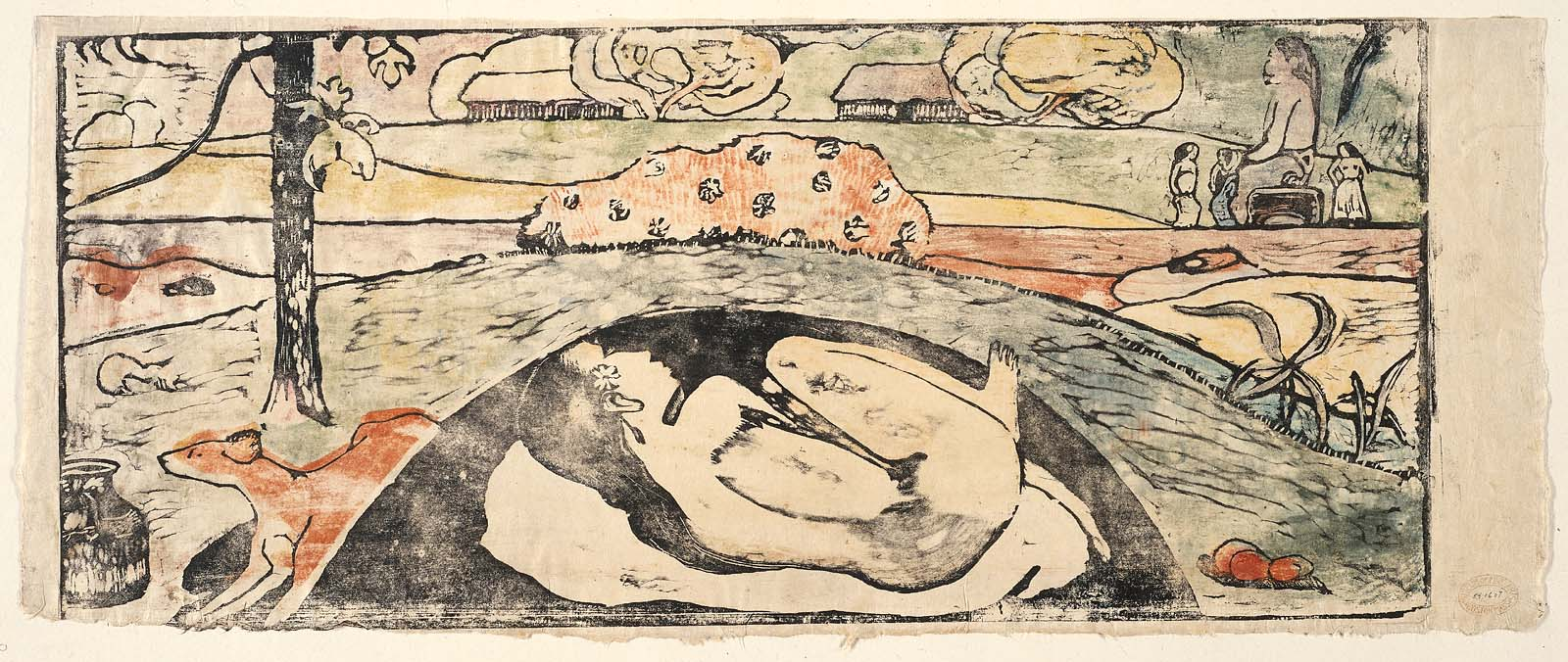
Manao Tupapau (The Spirit of the Dead Watching), woodcut, 1894–95, Museum of Fine Arts, Boston

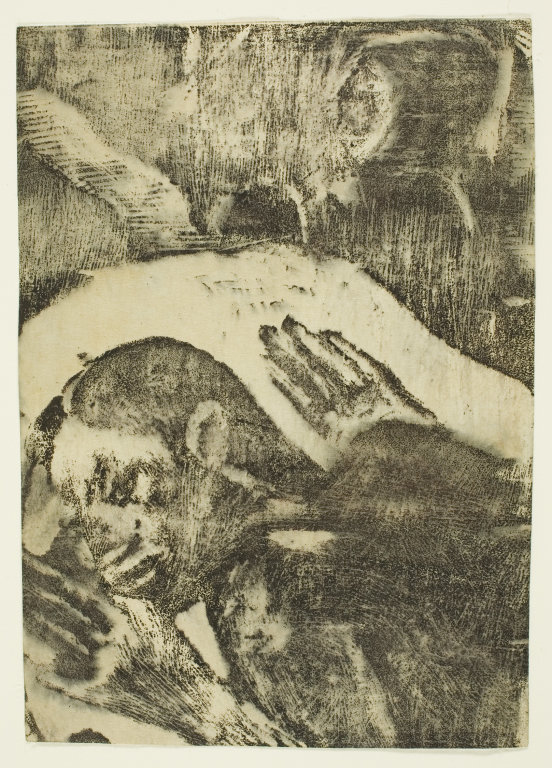
Manao Tupapau (Watched by the Spirits of the Dead), woodcut, 1894–95, Art Institute of Chicago

== History ==
The painting was among the eight canvases Gauguin sent for exhibition at Copenhagen in 1893. He evidently prized it highly, for in his letter to Monfreid quoted above he said he wanted to reserve it for a later sale, although he would let it go for 2,000 francs. Later that same year, when he returned to Paris, it was exhibited at his Durand-Ruel show, where it failed to sell for the 3,000 francs he asked for it, despite favourable reviews from critics including Edgar Dégas. It was included in his unsuccessful 1895 Hôtel Drouot sale to raise funds for his return to Tahiti, when he was obliged to buy it in for just 900 francs. Subsequently, he left it in the care of a dealer, who failed to sell it. By 1901 it was with Gauguin's new dealer Ambroise Vollard, with whom Gauguin had reached an arrangement that allowed him a measure of financial security in his final years. Vollard valued it at between only 400 and 500 francs. Eventually it reached the newly opened Galerie Druet, where it was acquired by Count Kesslar of Weimar, a noted patron of modern art. As publisher, Kesslar was responsible for publishing in 1906 the first monograph on Gauguin, by Jean de Rotonchamp.

Subsequent owners included Sir Michael Sadler and Lord Ivor Spencer-Churchill. It was purchased in 1929 by A. Conger Goodyear, whose art collection was bequeathed to the Buffalo Academy of Fine Arts housed at the Buffalo AKG Art Museum.

== See also ==
- List of paintings by Paul Gauguin

== References and sources ==
=== Sources ===
- Danielsson, Bengt (1965). Gauguin in the South Seas. New York: Doubleday and Company.
- Brettell, Richard (1988). "The Return to France". The Art of Paul Gauguin. with Peter Zegers. National Gallery of Art. pp. 308–9. ISBN 0-8212-1723-2. LCCN 88-81005..
- Eisenman, Stephen F. (1997). Gauguin's Skirt. London: Thames and Hudson. ISBN 0-500-01766-2.
- Field, Richard S. (1977). Paul Gauguin:The Paintings of the First Trip to Tahiti. Garland. ASIN B007EU412C.
- Frèches-Thory, Claire (1988). "The First Tahitian Years". The Art of Paul Gauguin. with Peter Zegers. National Gallery of Art. pp. 279–82, 317–29, 345–8. ISBN 0-8212-1723-2. LCCN 88-81005.
- Gamboni, Dario (2003). "Paul Gauguin's Genesis of a Picture: A Painter's Manifesto and Self-Analysis". Nineteenth-Century Art Worldwide. 2 (3).
- Gauguin, Paul. The letters of Paul Gauguin to Georges Daniel de Monfreid, translated by Ruth Pielkovo; foreword by Frederick O'Brien. archive.org
- Jolly, Margaret (2000). "Fraying Gauguin's Skirt: Gender, Race, and Liminality in Polynesia". Pacific Studies. 23 (1/2).
- Malingue, Maurice. Paul Gauguin: letters to his wife and friends. Cleveland, 1949. ASIN B000XJHQ0K
- Mathews, Nancy Mowll. Paul Gauguin: an erotic life, 2001. Yale University Press.
- Maurer, Naomi E. The pursuit of spiritual wisdom: the thought and art of Vincent van Gogh and Paul Gauguin, 1998. Fairleigh Dickinson University Press.
- Pollock, Griselda. Avant-Garde Gambits: Gender and the Colour of Art History, London: Thames and Hudson, 1993.
- Sweetman, David (1995). Paul Gauguin, A Life. New York City, New York: Simon & Schuster. ISBN 0-684-80941-9.
- Wadley, Nicholas (1985). Noa Noa: Gauguin's Tahiti, London: Phaidon Press. ISBN 0-7148-2375-9.
