= Hartell =

Hartell may refer to:

- Hartell, Alberta, an hamlet in Alberta, Canada

== People with the surname ==
- John A. Hartell (1902–1995), American artist
- Lee R. Hartell (1923–1951), United States Army officer and Medal of Honor recipient
