= Charles Prendergast =

American painter

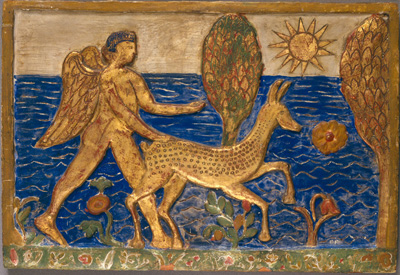
Charles Prendergast, Rising Sun, 1912

Charles Prendergast (1863–1948) was a Newfoundlander-American Post-Impressionist artist as well as a designer and maker of picture frames. He was the younger brother of the artist, Maurice Prendergast.

== Life ==
He was born on 27 May 1863 in St. John's, Newfoundland. In 1868 the family moved to Boston, Massachusetts, where he lived until 1914 when he and his brother moved to New York City.

In 1890 he traveled to Paris with Maurice, taking art classes with his brother who was studying at the Académie Colarossi and the Académie Julian. On his return to Boston, Charles became a custom woodworker, eventually focusing on creating unique picture frames influenced by the Arts and Crafts movement. He produced “highly prized, hand-carved frames for the greatest artists of his day, including John Singer Sargent.

He traveled to Italy in 1911, again with his brother, visiting Florence, Venice, Pisa, and Siena. On his return to Boston, he began to produce paintings in addition to his frames; he was then almost fifty years old. His first painting, Rising Sun, was on a carved wood and gesso panel.

In 1915 he exhibited his paintings at the Montross Gallery in New York and in 1917 and 1918 at the Society of Independent Artists. Throughout the 1930s and 1940s he exhibited at the Kraushaar Galleries, also in New York.

In 1927, Prendergast married Eugénie Van Kemmel. He died on 20 August 1948 at the age of eighty-five in Westport, Connecticut.

The Williams College Museum of Art in Williamstown, Massachusetts maintains the "Prendergast Archive and Study Center"; it was established in 1983 in cooperation with Charles' widow, Eugénie Prendergast (1894–1994). Their collection holds approximately four hundred works by Charles and Maurice Prendergast, as well as about fifteen-hundred related archival objects.

== Influence of Maurice Prendergast ==
Richard J. Wattenmaker, then Director of the Rutgers University Art Gallery, wrote in 1968: "By far the most pervasive influence on Prendergast was the work of his brother, Maurice. The profound intimacy of ideas between the two is freely reflected in the joyous spontaneity and jewel-like, color-laden decorativeness which permeate both their work, as well as the innovational flexibility with which each handles his chosen medium."

== Art market ==
In May 1998 Charles Prendergast's painting, Spirit of the Hunt, sold for $1,432,500 in a public auction at Christie's.

Spirit of the Hunt is signed with the initials of both Charles and his brother, Maurice, but Nancy Mowll Mathews, art historian and noted authority on the Prendergasts, writes: "The style of this panel can only be associated with Charles. [...] Indeed, when the work was published in 1919, no mention is made of the hand of Maurice."

== Collections ==
This is an incomplete list.

- Addison Gallery of American Art, Andover, Massachusetts
- Barnes Foundation, Merion, Pennsylvania
- Hirshhorn Museum and Sculpture Garden, Washington, D.C.
- Metropolitan Museum of Art, New York, New York
- Rhode Island School of Design Museum, Providence, Rhode Island
- Museum of Fine Arts, Boston, Massachusetts
- Newark Museum, Newark, New Jersey
- Wadsworth Atheneum, Hartford, Connecticut
- Williams College Museum of Art, Williamstown, Massachusetts
- Whitney Museum of American Art, New York, New York

== Gallery ==
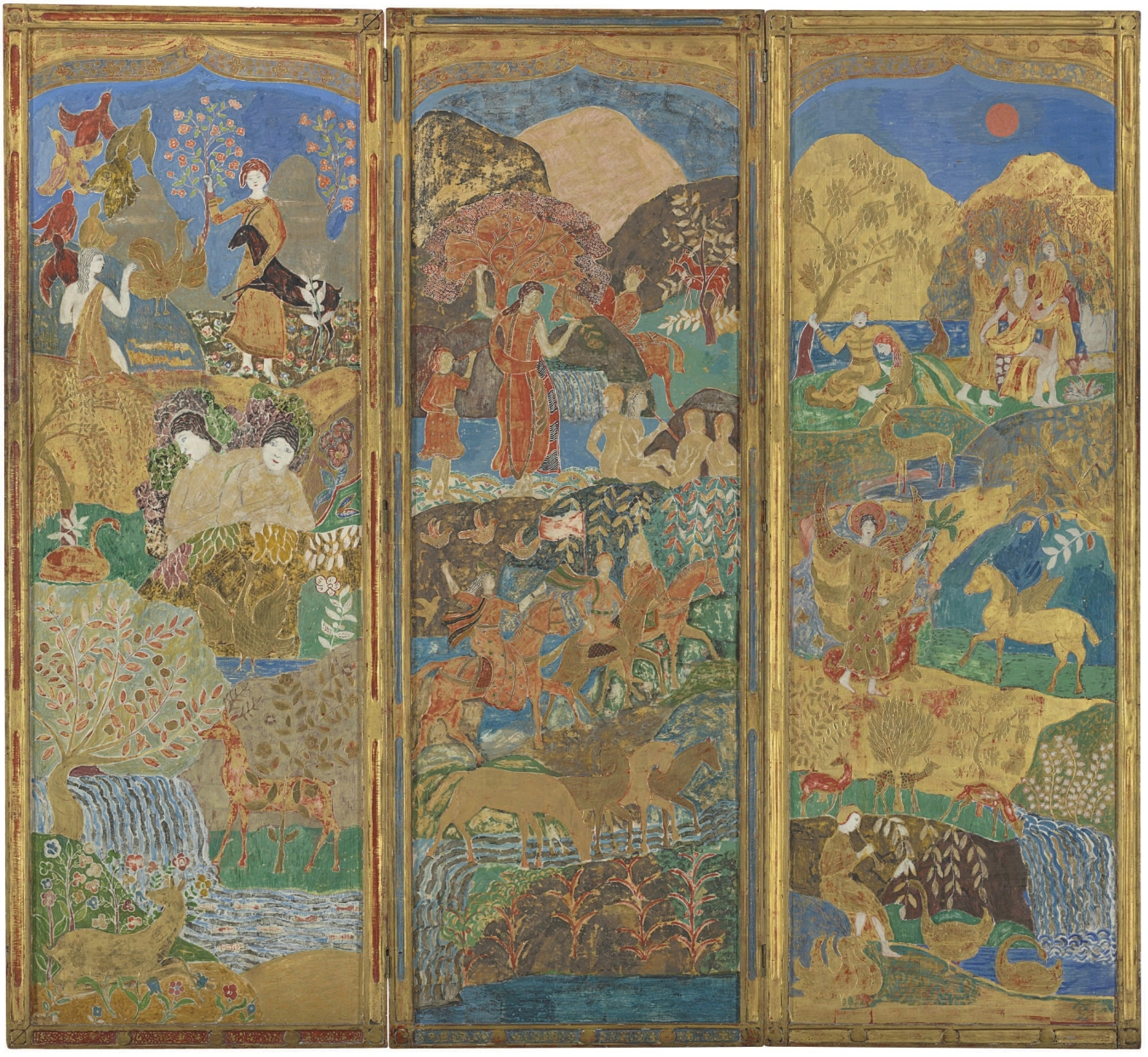
Charles Prendergast, Three-Panel Screen (front), c. 1916-1917, oil and gold leaf on gessoed wood, each panel, 75 x 27¼ in, private collection.

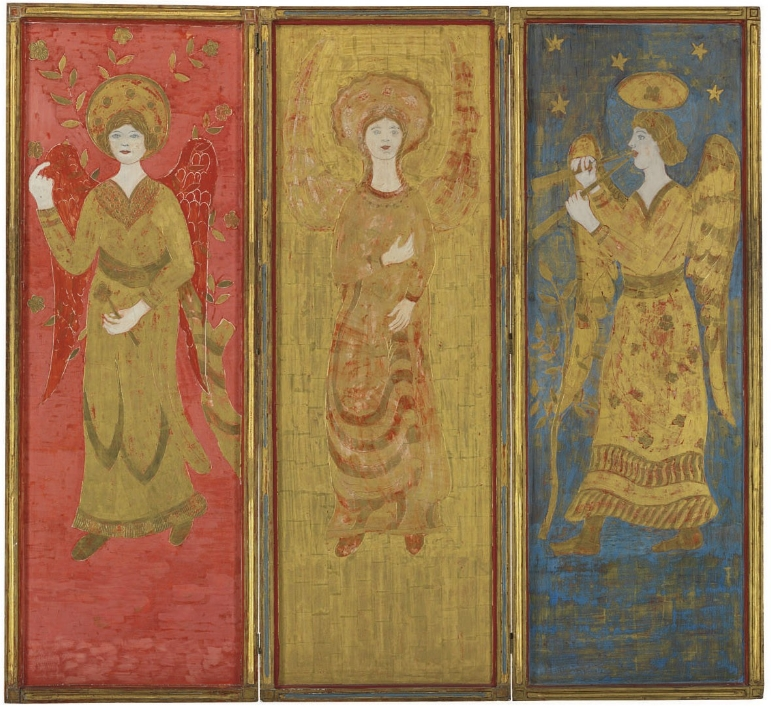
Charles Prendergast, Three-Panel Screen (back), c. 1916-1917, oil and gold leaf on gessoed wood, each panel, 75 x 27¼ in, private collection.

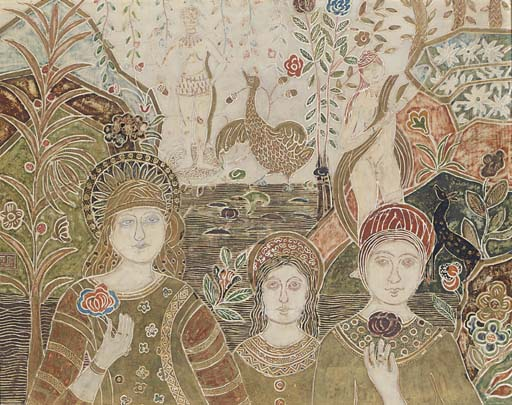
Charles Prendergast, The Offering, c. 1916-1917, tempera and gold leaf on carved panel, 20 x 25 in, private collection.

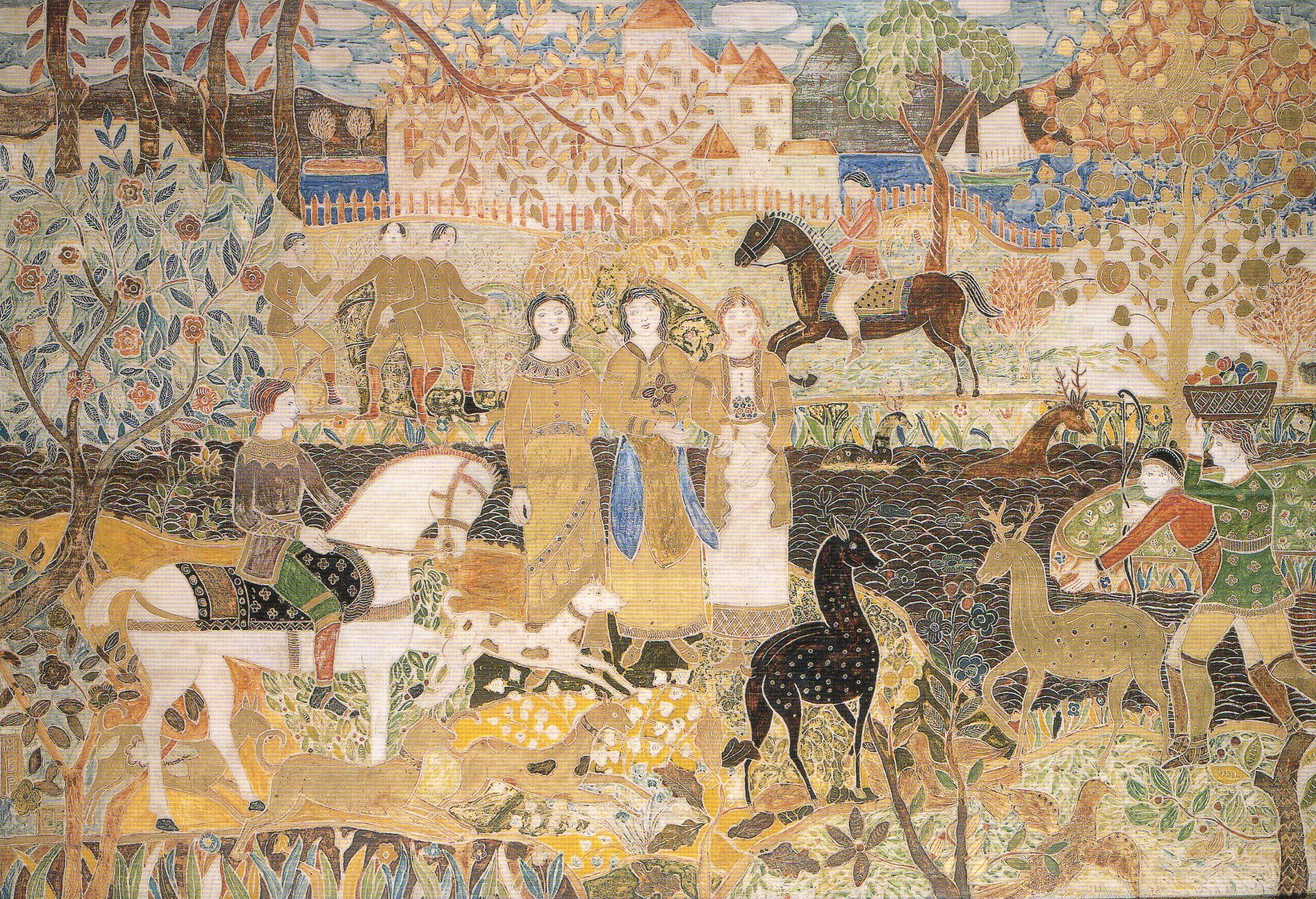
Charles Prendergast and Maurice Prendergast, The Spirit of the Hunt, before 1919, tempera, gold and silver leaf, and pencil on gessoed panel, 55 x 80½ in, private collection.

== Catalogue raisonné ==
- Clark, Carol; Mathews, Nancy Mowll; Owens, Gwendolyn (1990). Maurice Brazil Prendergast, Charles Prendergast: A Catalogue Raisonné. Williamstown, MA: Williams College Museum of Art and Prestel-Verlag, Munich. ISBN 9783791309651.
