= Kraushaar Galleries =

Art gallery in New York City

Coordinates: 40°46′32.34″N 73°57′40.05″W

Kraushaar Galleries is an art gallery in New York City founded in 1885 by Charles W. Kraushaar, who had previously been with the European art gallery, William Schaus Sr.

The Gallery's first location on Broadway at 33rd Street where it showed Dutch and French Barbizon paintings, as well as works by Courbet, Corot, Whistler and Fantin-Latour. When John Kraushaar, Charles's younger brother, joined the business the gallery also began showing modern French painters: Soutine, Matisse, Braque, Derain, Gauguin, Rodin, Roualt, Guys, Modigliani, Redon, Segonzac, Picasso, Van Gogh, and other late 19th- and early 20th-century artists. In 1901, at their new gallery at 260 Fifth Avenue, they exhibited the work of the Swiss-born American society painter Adolfo Müller-Ury.

Later John Kraushaar began showing works by American artists, particularly Robert Henri and his circle, and the group known as The Eight, Henri, John Sloan, William Glackens, Everett Shinn, George Luks, Maurice Prendergast, Ernest Lawson and Arthur B. Davies. He also exhibited the work of Guy Pène du Bois and Charles Prendergast.

After his brother's death in 1917, John Kraushaar continued the business. When John fell ill in the 1930s, his daughter, Antoinette M. Kraushaar, took over affairs. Upon his death in 1946, she became the owner of the gallery, a role she filled until 1988. In the 1940s newer American painters were added. Among them were John A. Hartell. The gallery is now located at 74 East 79th Street and functions as a private gallery, retaining its focus art of the first half of the twentieth century.

== Sources ==
- Clark, Lenore, Forbes Watson: Independent revolutionary, Kent State University Press, 2001. ISBN 0-87338-710-4
- Kraushaar Galleries, A History of Kraushaar Galleries
