= Vahine no te vi =

Painting by Paul Gauguin

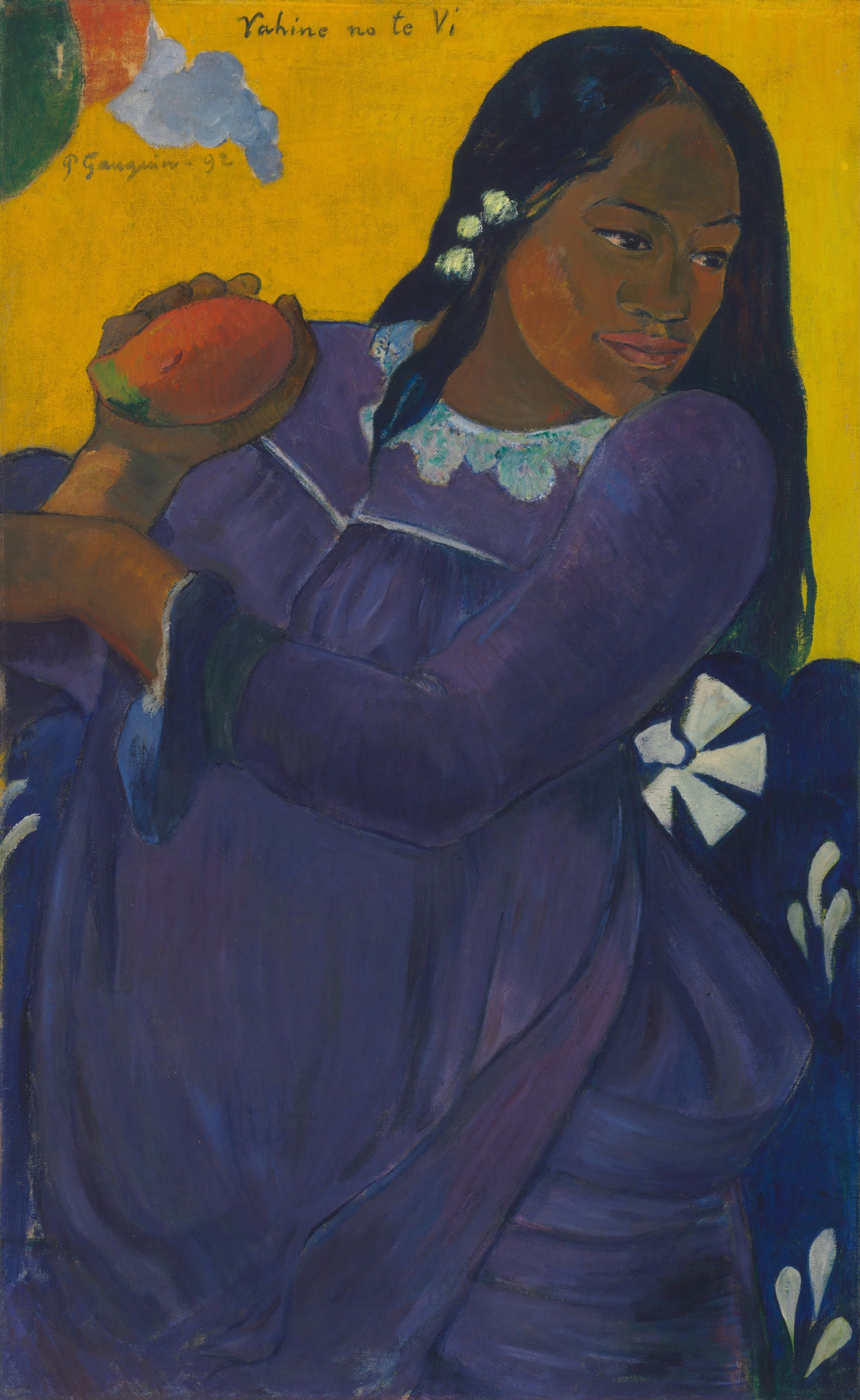
- Artist: Paul Gauguin
- Year: 1892
- Type: Oil paint on canvas
- Dimensions: 193.5 by 103 centimetres (76.2 in × 40.6 in)
- Location: Baltimore Museum of Art, Baltimore, Maryland, United States of America

Vahine no te vi (English: Woman with a Mango) is an 1892 painting by Paul Gauguin, currently in the collection of the Baltimore Museum of Art. It is one of the earliest of about seventy paintings he produced during his first visit to Tahiti and is one of many works of modern art in the museum's Cone Collection.

The painting depicts Tehaʼamana or Tehura, Gauguin's 13-year-old child-wife and mother of his child. Gauguin returned to Paris before the birth and by the time he returned Tehura had remarried a local man, with whom she brought up the child. The work was subsequently acquired by Degas.

== See also ==
- List of paintings by Paul Gauguin
