= John A. Hartell =

American artist

John Anthony Hartell (1902–1995) was an American artist of first the Impressionist and later the Modern styles. He was born in Brooklyn. As an artist, Hartell gives shape and form to those aspects which are least substantial: light, atmosphere, and memory.

== Early life ==
Hartell’s undergraduate studies were in a technical field, with art appealing to him as a secondary interest. He earned his bachelor's degree in architecture from Cornell University in 1925, where he joined the Phi Kappa Psi fraternity. He was then selected for a graduate fellowship at the Royal Academy of Fine Arts in Stockholm. John practiced his art during these years and continued to do so over the next forty years while teaching architecture at Clemson College and the University of Illinois and, after 1930, back on the Hill at Cornell, where he also taught art.

Once in Ithaca, New York, Hartell sought to bring art into the lives of both Cornell students and faculty, including by organizing an art exhibit in the Willard Straight Memorial featuring hundreds of works. In 1936, he illustrated “Over in the Meadow; an old Nursery Rhyme.” During that period, he was commissioned to design a number of residences. He also partnered with a New York architect on buildings for the World's Fair of 1939. Cornell asked Hartell to serve on the Committee for Fine Arts in 1941. He remained active with his undergraduate literary pursuits, writing for the last Cornell Widow for 1942. The alumni writing effort was conceived of by Widow editor Knox B. Burger, son of Hartell’s fraternity brother and fellow Irving Literary Society member Carl B. Burger, the former Widow art editor.

Hartell was considered to be a mature artist after the Second World War, being featured at the Kraushaar Galleries in New York City, following in the tradition of his fraternity brother Reynolds Beal, who was also exhibited there as early as 1929. After his retirement from teaching in 1968, Harte painted full time. Much of his imagery came from the lakes and woods of upstate New York, where he lived, and from the eastern Long Island he knew as a boy.

== Death and honors ==
Hartell died at his home in Ithaca, New York in 1995. Cornell University named its Sibley Hall art gallery the John A. Hartell Gallery and established the position of John A. Hartell Intern (Prints, Drawings, and Photographs) at the Herbert F. Johnson Museum of Art as well as the John A. Hartell Award for Distinguished Teaching.
