= Bengt Danielsson =

Swedish anthropologist (1921–1997)

- Bengt and his wife, Marie-Thérèse Danielsson
- Born: July 6, 1921; Krokek, Sweden
- Died: July 4, 1997 (aged 75); Stockholm, Sweden
- Education: Uppsala University
- Occupations: Anthropologist; Writer
- Employer: National Museum of Ethnology (Sweden)
- Known for: Crew member on the Kon-Tiki; Right Livelihood Award (1991)
- Spouse: Marie-Thérèse Danielsson (m. 1948)
- Children: Maruia (1952–1972)

Bengt Emmerik Danielsson (6 July 1921 – 4 July 1997) was a Swedish anthropologist, writer, and a crew member on the Kon-Tiki raft expedition from South America to French Polynesia in 1947. In 1991, he was awarded the Right Livelihood Award for "exposing the tragic results of and advocating an end to French nuclear colonialism."

== Early life ==
Danielsson was born on 6 July 1921 in Krokek, Sweden and was the son of chief physician Emmerik Danielsson (1875–1927) and Greta, née Källgren (1889–1990). His father died in a traffic accident when he was six years old, and after that Danielsson grew up in Norrköping with his mother and aunt, who both encouraged his adventuring ambitions.

== Career ==
Danielsson obtained a Licentiate of Philosophy from Uppsala University in 1954 and a Doctor of Philosophy in anthropology in 1955. Danielsson was intendant at the Bishop Museum in Honolulu, Hawaii from 1952 to 1966. Danielsson was Swedish consul in French Polynesia from 1961 to 1978 and extra museum director of Sweden's National Museum of Ethnology from 1966 to 1971. He was also correspondent for the Pacific Islands Monthly.

He participated in the Swedish-Norwegian Amazon Expedition 1946–47, the Kon-Tiki expedition in 1947, Tuamotu Expedition 1949–51, the Pacific Science Board Expedition in 1952, Expedition to western Polynesia in 1953, Around Australia 1955–56, Vanderbilt Foundation expedition to the Society Islands in 1957 and Sveriges Radio's TV expedition to the South Pacific Ocean in 1962.

After the Kon-Tiki expedition, Danielsson married in Lima in 1948, a French woman, Marie-Thérèse Sailley (1923–2003), daughter of factory owner Abel Sailley and Josephine, née Mayer. They decided to settle in Raroia, the atoll on which the raft had made landfall. They stayed there from 1949 to 1952, and in 1953 they moved to Tahiti. His doctoral thesis on the Tuamotus island chain, submitted to Uppsala University in 1955, was published the following year as Work and Life on Raroia. He subsequently wrote many books and scripted many films, becoming one of the world's foremost students of Polynesia. He and his wife were particularly outspoken critics of French nuclear tests at Moruroa and Fangataufa atolls, and of the destruction of Polynesian culture through colonialism. Their daughter Maruia (1952–1972) died from cancer.

Marie-Thérèse and Bengt Danielsson received the Right Livelihood Award for their campaigning work in 1991. Bengt died in July 1997 following a deterioration in his health, and was buried at Östra Tollstad Church in Mjölby Municipality, Sweden.

== Selected bibliography ==
- Danielsson, Bengt (1956). Work and Life on Raroia: An Acculturation Study from the Tuamotu Group, French Oceania. London: G. Allen & Unwin.
- Danielsson, Bengt (1960). From Raft to Raft. London: G. Allen & Unwin.
- Danielsson, Bengt (1962). What Happened on the Bounty. London: G. Allen & Unwin.
- Danielsson, Bengt (1965). Love in the South Seas. New York: Reynal.
- Danielsson, Bengt (1965). Gauguin in the South Seas. Garden City, N.Y.: Doubleday.
- Danielsson, Bengt & Marie-Thérèse (1977). Moruroa mon amour. London: Harmondsworth, Penguin.
- Danielsson, Bengt & Marie-Thérèse (1986). Poisoned Reign: French Nuclear Colonialism in the Pacific. New York: Penguin Books. ISBN 0-14-008130-5.
