= Nancy Mowll Mathews =

American art critic, curator, professor, and television host

Nancy Mowll Mathews (born 1947 in Baltimore) is a Czech-American art historian, curator and author. She was the Eugénie Prendergast Senior Curator of 19th and 20th Century Art at the Williams College Museum of Art from 1988 to 2010. She is currently an independent scholar, curator, professor and host of the television show Art World with Nancy Mathews.

She graduated from Goucher College and went on to complete an MA in art history at Case Western Reserve University and a PhD at the New York University Institute of Fine Arts. Before joining the Williams College faculty in 1988, she was a professor at Randolph-Macon Woman's College from 1977 to 1987.

Mathews is the author of Mary Cassatt: A Life and of several other books on Mary Cassatt, and of Paul Gauguin: An Erotic Life (2001). She curated the exhibition "Moving Pictures: American Art and Early Film, 1880-1910" and edited the related book of the same title. She co-authored the catalogue raisonné of the works of Maurice and Charles Prendergast, as well as several other books and exhibitions on the American artist-brothers, under the auspices of the Prendergast Archive and Study Center at the Williams College Museum of Art.

== Major publications ==
- Maurice Prendergast: By the Sea, Consulting editor, principal essayist (Munich, London and New York: Delmonico Books/Prestel, 2013). In conjunction with the exhibition of the same name.
- Prendergast in Italy, Principal author and editor. (London: Merrell, 2009). In conjunction with an exhibition of the same name, co-organized by WCMA and Terra Foundation of American Art. Arguably Prendergast's greatest works, the watercolors and monotypes created during two trips to Italy (1898–99 and 1911–12) show his involvement with issues of modern and Old Master art in a country undergoing complex political and cultural modernization. Includes six essays on Prendergast's Italian works, traveling writers and artists’ views of Italy, and the early years of the Venice biennale.
- Mary Cassatt: Friends and Family (Shelburne, VT: The Shelburne Museum, 2008). In conjunction with an exhibition of the same name.
- Art in America: Three Centuries of Innovation. (New York: Guggenheim Museum, 2007). Co-editor and essayist with Susan Davidson and Elizabeth Kennedy. In conjunction with an exhibition of the same name organized by the Guggenheim Museum to be held in Beijing, Shanghai, and Bilbao, 2007–8.
- Moving Pictures: American Art and Early Film, 1880–1910. (New York: Hudson Hills, 2005) Primary author and editor; with Charles Musser and twelve additional essayists. An examination of the relationship between early film and American painting in the late 19th and early 20th centuries. Focuses on new meanings of realism and ways of seeing after the introduction of motion pictures. In conjunction with exhibition of the same name.
- Paul Gauguin: An Erotic Life (Yale U. Press, 2001) A biographical examination of Gauguin with an emphasis on his use of sexuality and violence as a strategy in his life and art (316 pp.).
- American Dreams: American Art to 1950 in the Williams College Museum of Art. (New York: Hudson Hills, 2001) “Book of Essays” (Sixty Highlights of the Collection) by 47 different scholars. Project manager, editor, and contributor (240 pp.). Related exhibition: WCMA (2001-ongoing)
- The Art of Leisure: Maurice Prendergast in the Williams College Museum of Art (Williamstown: WCMA, 1999) Series of essays on aspects of turn-of-the-century American leisure as represented in ten works by Maurice Prendergast. Catalogue of all the works by Maurice Prendergast in the WCMA collection. (160 pp.).
- Mary Cassatt: A Life (Yale U. Press, 1998) Complete biographical treatment of the artist and her historical context (384 pp.).
- Cassatt: A Retrospective (New York: Hugh Lauter Levin Associates, 1996), editor. Selected writings by and about Mary Cassatt, with appropriate illustrations (ca. 300 pp.). Latest in a series which features Impressionist and Post-Impressionist artists.
- The Art of Charles Prendergast from the Collections of the Williams College Museum of Art and Mrs. Charles Prendergast (Williamstown: Williams College Museum of Art, 1993, 120 pp.). Essays and catalogue entries on the art of Charles Prendergast, accompanied exhibition, "Beauties . . . of a Quiet Kind" (see under exhibitions).
- Maurice Prendergast (Munich: Prestel-Verlag, 1990, 196 pp.). Exhibition catalogue and monograph to accompany exhibition of the same name (see under Exhibitions).
- Maurice Brazil Prendergast, Charles Prendergast: A Catalogue Raisonné (Munich: Prestel-Verlag, 1990, 811 pp.). A catalogue raisonné of the oils, watercolors, pastels, drawings, sketchbooks, monotypes, graphic works, panels, sculptures and decorative artists of Maurice and Charles Prendergast. Co-author with Carol Clark and Gwendolyn Owens; Milton Brown, Senior Editor.
- Mary Cassatt: The Color Prints (New York: Harry N. Abrams, 1989, 208 pp.). Exhibition catalogue and catalogue raisonné to accompany exhibition of the same name (see under Exhibitions). Co-author with Barbara Shapiro, Associate Curator of Prints, Museum of Fine Arts, Boston.
- Mary Cassatt (New York: Harry N. Abrams, 1987, 162 pp.). Monograph on Cassatt's life and career incorporating latest research and newly discovered works.
- Cassatt and Her Circle: Selected Letters (New York: Abbeville Press, 1984, 362 pp.). Volume of edited and documented letters with introductory commentaries.
- Mary Cassatt: Prints and Drawings from the Collection of Ambroise Vollard. (2008). (New York: Adelson Galleries. ISBN 0-9815801-0-6.) Exhibition catalogue, with Warren Adelson; Sarah Bertalan; Susan Pinsky, and Marc Rosen.
