= Nevermore (Gauguin) =

Painting by Paul Gauguin

- O Taiti
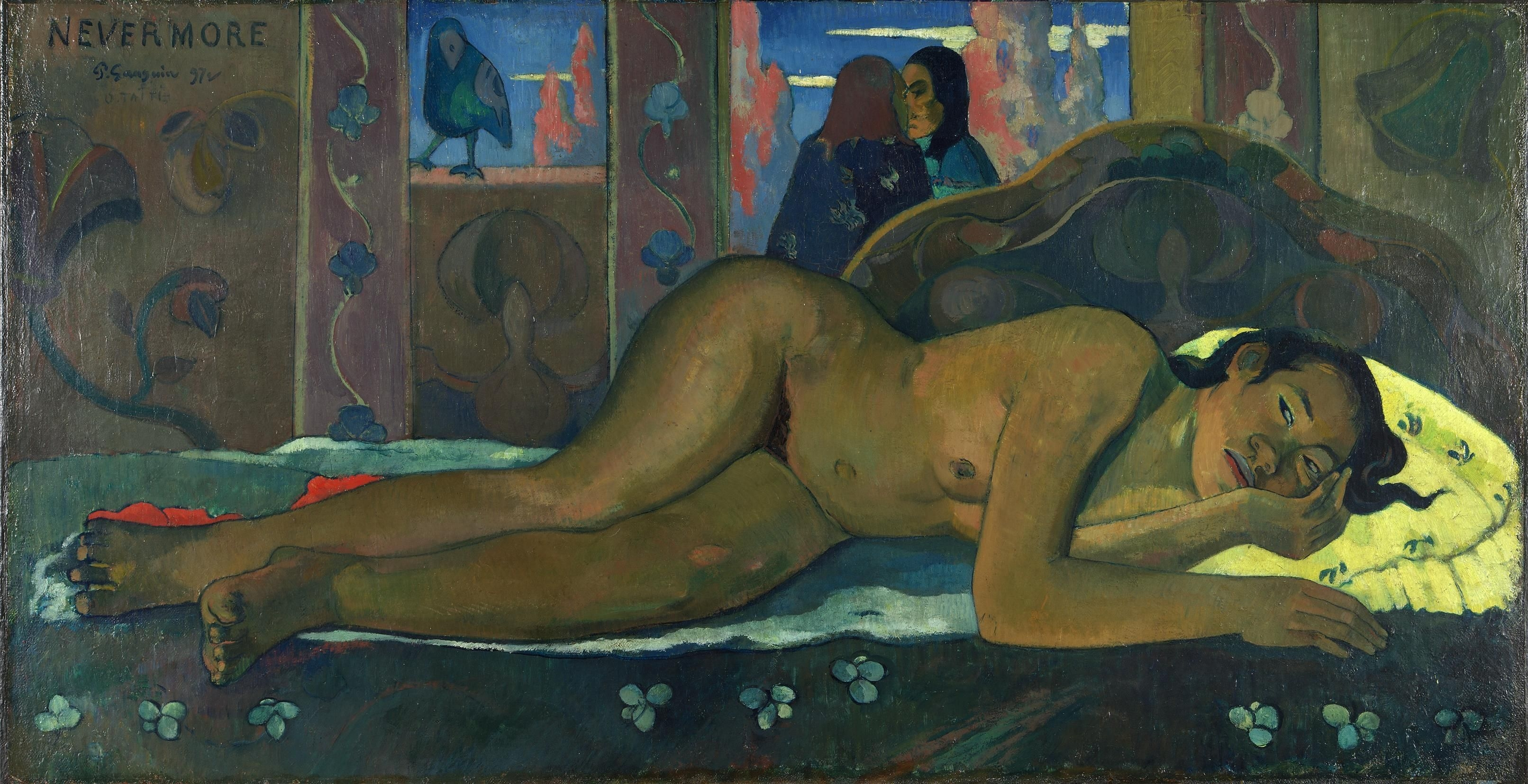
- Artist: Paul Gauguin
- Year: 1897
- Medium: Oil on canvas
- Dimensions: 96 cm × 130 cm (38 in × 51 in)
- Location: Courtauld Gallery, London

Nevermore is an 1897 oil on canvas painting by the French Post-Impressionist artist Paul Gauguin. Since 1932 it has been in the collection of the Courtauld Institute of Art and on display in the Gallery. It was executed during the artist's second stay on the island of Tahiti in the South Pacific.

The enigmatic work depicts a naked Pahura, Gauguin's teenage vahine or wife, lying on a bed in their hut, her figure echoed by the curves of the headboard. In the background behind the bed can be seen a raven and two mysterious human figures.

The title "Nevermore", painted in relatively large capitals in the top left-hand corner, and the presence of the raven is an obvious reference to Edgar Allan Poe's 1845 poem "The Raven", which was well known to Gauguin and recited at his farewell party in 1891. In the poem, a mourning student is visited in his room by a raven who croaks the one word "nevermore" in response to his every question. At the time the painting was executed Pahura was grieving the loss of her first child (by Gauguin). Gauguin had not yet lost his favourite European-born daughter Aline, who died in April 1897: Nevermore was executed in February. The artist himself claimed the bird represented a "bird of the devil who watches".

The painting was purchased in 1898 by the British composer Frederick Delius from Gauguin's friend George-Daniel de Monfreid for 500 francs. It was later bought by the British businessman Samuel Courtauld in 1926, who gifted it to the Courtauld Institute of Art.

In 2010, the painting was voted Britain's most romantic in a poll organised by the Art Fund Charity. It beat the competition from a five painting shortlist, which included masterpieces by Jan van Eyck and Titian.
