= Courtauld Gallery =

Art museum in London, England

Coordinates: 51°30′42.3″N 0°07′02.9″W

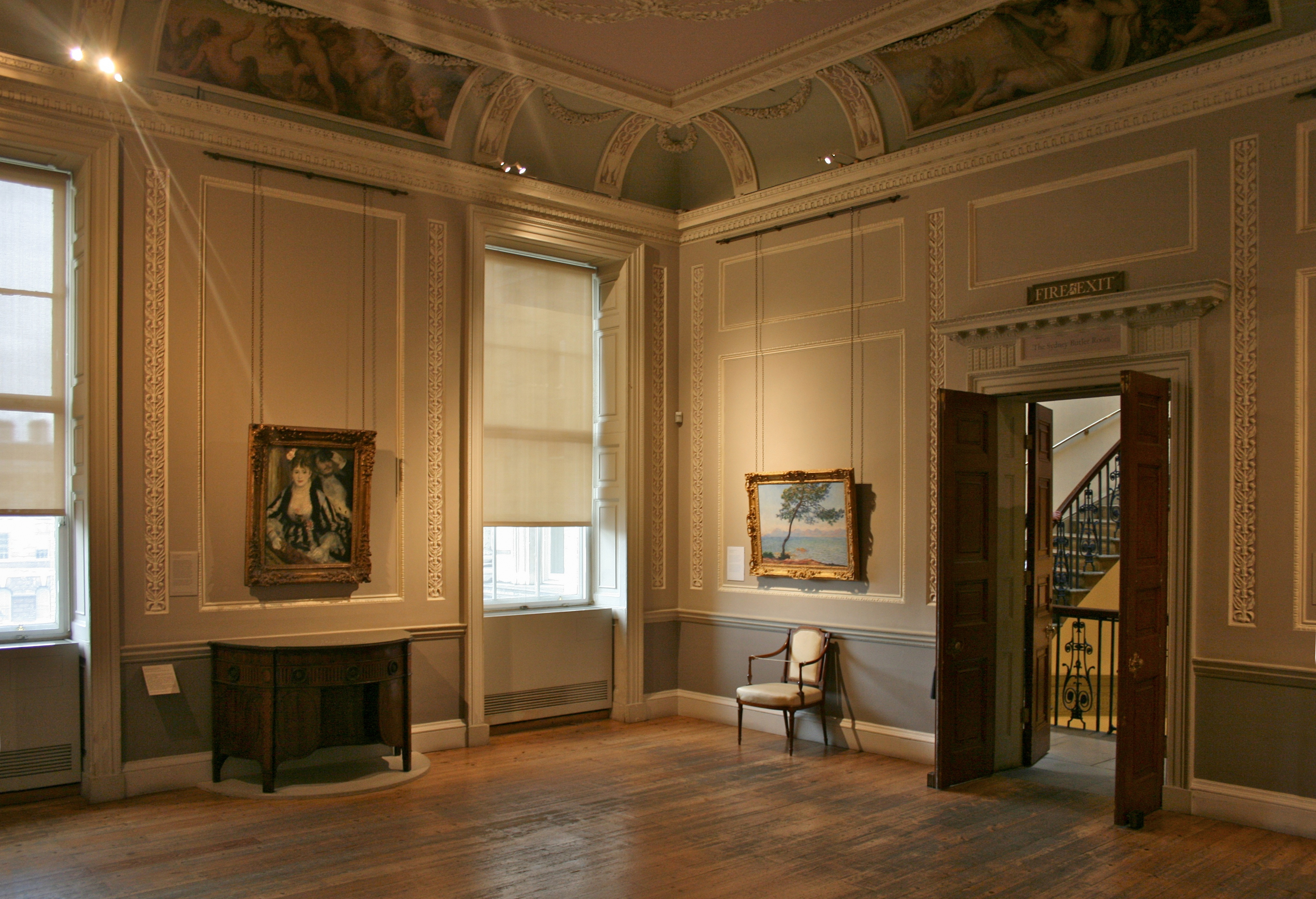
- Interior of the Courtauld Gallery

- Location within Central London
- Established: 1932; 94 years ago
- Location: Somerset House, Strand; London, WC2; England
- Type: Art collection
- Collection size: 530 paintings; 26,000 drawings
- Director: Ernst Vegelin
- Public transit access: Temple; Charing Cross
- Website: courtauld.ac.uk

The Courtauld Gallery (UK: /ˈkɔːrtoʊld/) is an art museum in Somerset House, on the Strand in central London. It houses the collection of the Samuel Courtauld Trust and operates as an integral part of the Courtauld Institute of Art.

The Courtauld collection was formed largely through donations and bequests, and includes paintings, drawings, sculptures and other works from medieval to modern times. It is particularly known for its French Impressionist and Post-Impressionist paintings. The collection contains some 530 paintings and over 26,000 drawings and prints. The head of the Courtauld Gallery is Ernst Vegelin. The gallery closed on 3 September 2018 for a major redevelopment, called Courtauld Connects, and reopened on 19 November 2021.

The Courtauld Institute of Art is a self-governing college of the University of London specialising in the study of the history of art. The director designate of the Courtauld Institute of Art is Professor Mark Hallett.

== History ==
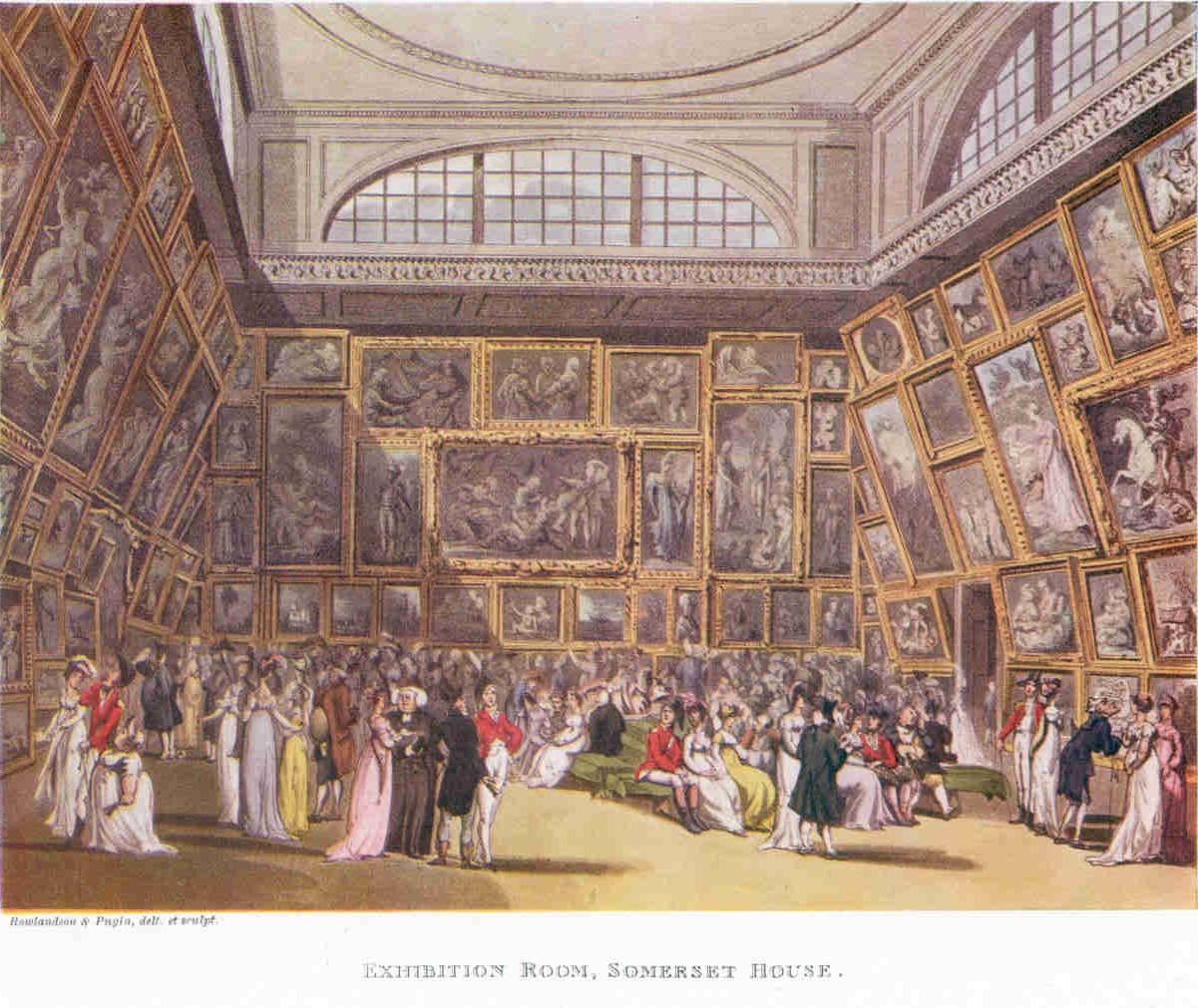
Pugin's Exhibition Room, Somerset House, showing a room which is now part of the Courtauld Gallery

The Courtauld Institute was founded in 1932 through the philanthropic efforts of the industrialist and art collector Samuel Courtauld, the diplomat and collector Lord Lee of Fareham, and the art historian Sir Robert Witt.

The art collection at the Courtauld was begun by Samuel Courtauld, who in the same year presented an extensive collection of paintings, mainly French Impressionist and Post-Impressionist works. He made further gifts later in the 1930s and a bequest in 1948.

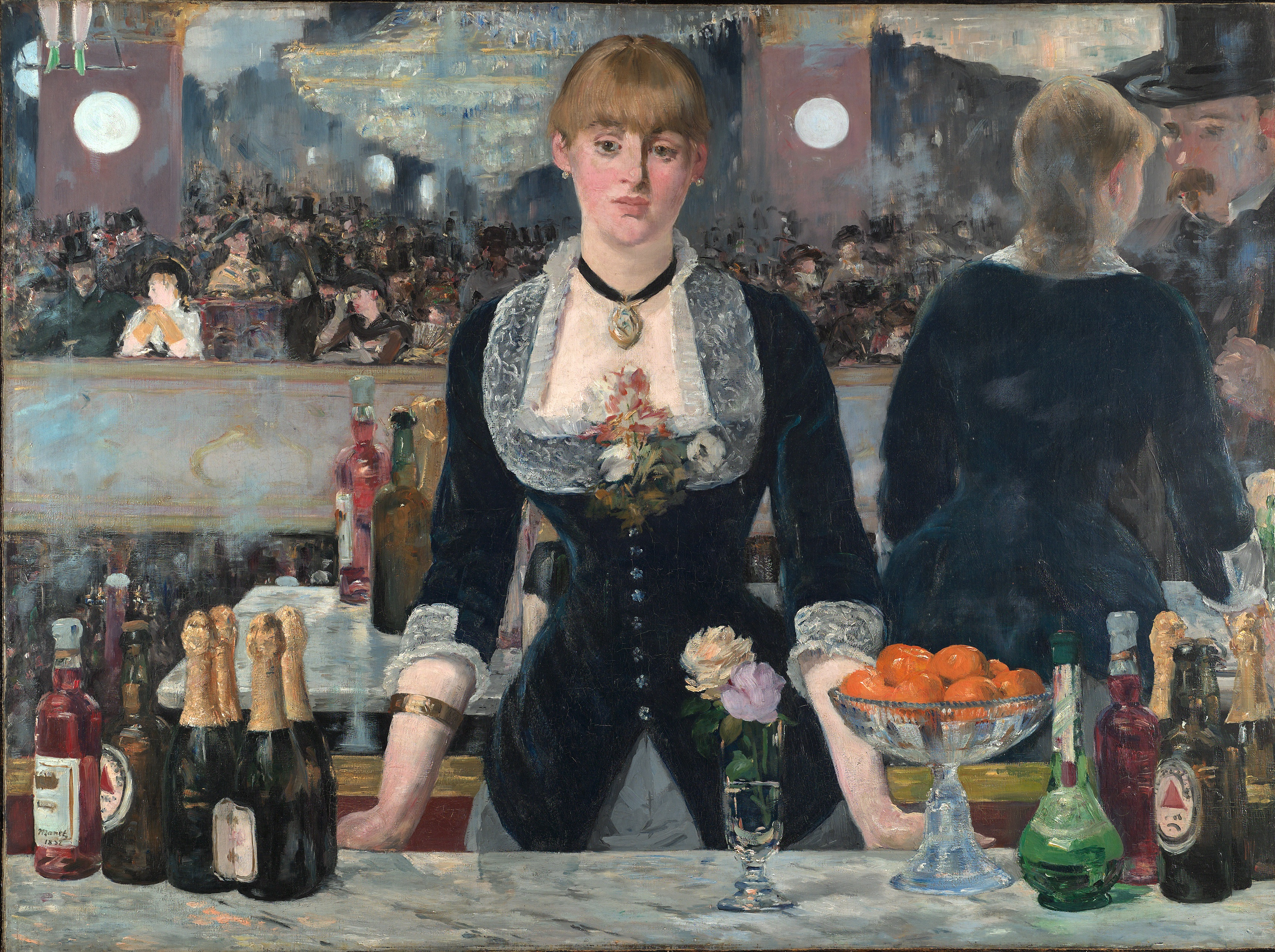
A Bar at the Folies-Bergère (1882) by Édouard Manet

His collection included Manet's A Bar at the Folies-Bergère and a version of the Déjeuner sur l'Herbe, Renoir's La Loge, landscapes by Claude Monet and Camille Pissarro, a ballet scene by Edgar Degas, and a group of eight major works by Cézanne. Other paintings include Vincent van Gogh's Self-Portrait with Bandaged Ear and Peach Blossoms in the Crau, Gauguin's Nevermore and Te Rerioa, and important works by Seurat, Henri "le Douanier" Rousseau, Toulouse-Lautrec and Modigliani.

Further bequests were added after the Second World War, most notably the collection of Old Master paintings assembled by Lord Lee, a founder of the institute. This included Cranach's Adam and Eve and a sketch in oils by Peter Paul Rubens for what is arguably his masterpiece, the Deposition altarpiece in Antwerp Cathedral.

Sir Robert Witt, also a founder of the Courtauld Institute, was an outstanding benefactor and bequeathed his important collection of Old Master and British drawings in 1952. His bequest included 20,000 prints and more than 3000 drawings. His son, Sir John Witt, later gave more English watercolours and drawings to the Gallery.

In 1958, Pamela Diamand, the daughter of Roger Fry the art critic and founder of the Omega Workshops, donated his collection of 20th-century art including works by Bloomsbury Group artists Vanessa Bell and Duncan Grant.

In 1966, Mark Gambier-Parry, son of Major Ernest Gambier-Parry, bequeathed the diverse collection of art formed by his grandfather, Thomas Gambier Parry, which ranged from Early Italian Renaissance painting to majolica, medieval enamel and ivory carvings, and other types of art (see section below).

Dr William Wycliffe Spooner (1882–1967) and his wife Mercie added to the Gallery's collection of English watercolours in 1967 with a bequest of works by John Constable, John Sell Cotman, Alexander and John Robert Cozens, Thomas Gainsborough, Thomas Girtin, Samuel Palmer, Thomas Rowlandson, Paul Sandby, Francis Towne, J. M. W. Turner, Peter De Wint and others.

In 1974, a group of thirteen watercolours by Turner was presented in memory of Sir Stephen Courtauld, who restored Eltham Palace, and the brother of Samuel Courtauld.

In 1978 the Courtauld received the Princes Gate Collection of Old Master paintings and drawings formed by Count Antoine Seilern. The collection rivals the Samuel Courtauld Collection in importance. It includes paintings by Bernardo Daddi, Robert Campin, Bruegel, Quentin Matsys, van Dyck and Tiepolo, but is strongest in the works of Rubens. The bequest also included a group of 19th- and 20th‑century works by Pissarro, Edgar Degas, Pierre-Auguste Renoir and Oskar Kokoschka.

The art dealer and art historian Lillian Browse donated more than thirty works in 1982, and bequeathed a further eight; among them were bronzes by Degas and Rodin, and paintings by William Nicholson and Walter Sickert.

A collection of more than 50 British watercolours, including eight by Turner, was left to the Gallery by Dorothy Scharf in 2004.

The gallery closed on 3 September 2018 until 19 November 2021 for a major redevelopment costing £50M.

== Location ==
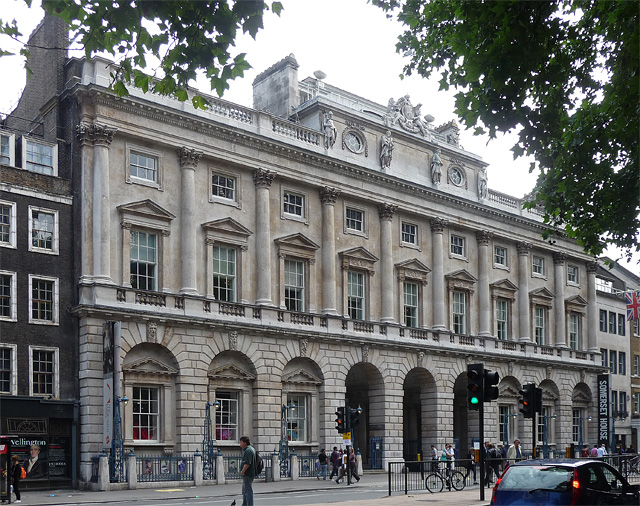
The Strand block of Somerset House, designed by William Chambers from 1775 to 1780, home of the Courtauld Institute and the Courtauld Gallery since 1989

From 1958 to 1989 the Courtauld collection was housed in part of the premises of the Warburg Institute in Woburn Square; it was thus separated from the Courtauld Institute, which was in Home House, Portman Square.

Since 1989 it has been housed, together with the Courtauld Institute, in the North or Strand block of Somerset House, in the rooms designed and purpose-built by Sir William Chambers for the learned societies, namely the Royal Academy (of which Chambers was the first Treasurer), the Royal Society and the Society of Antiquaries.

The Royal Academy occupied them from their completion in 1780 until it moved to the new National Gallery building in Trafalgar Square in 1837. Inscribed over the entrance to the Great Room, in which the annual Royal Academy summer exhibition was held, is the inscription ΟΥΔΕΙΣ ΑΜΟΥΣΟΣ ΕΙΣΙΤΩ ("Let no stranger to the Muses enter" in Ancient Greek).

== Highlights of the collection ==
=== Paintings ===
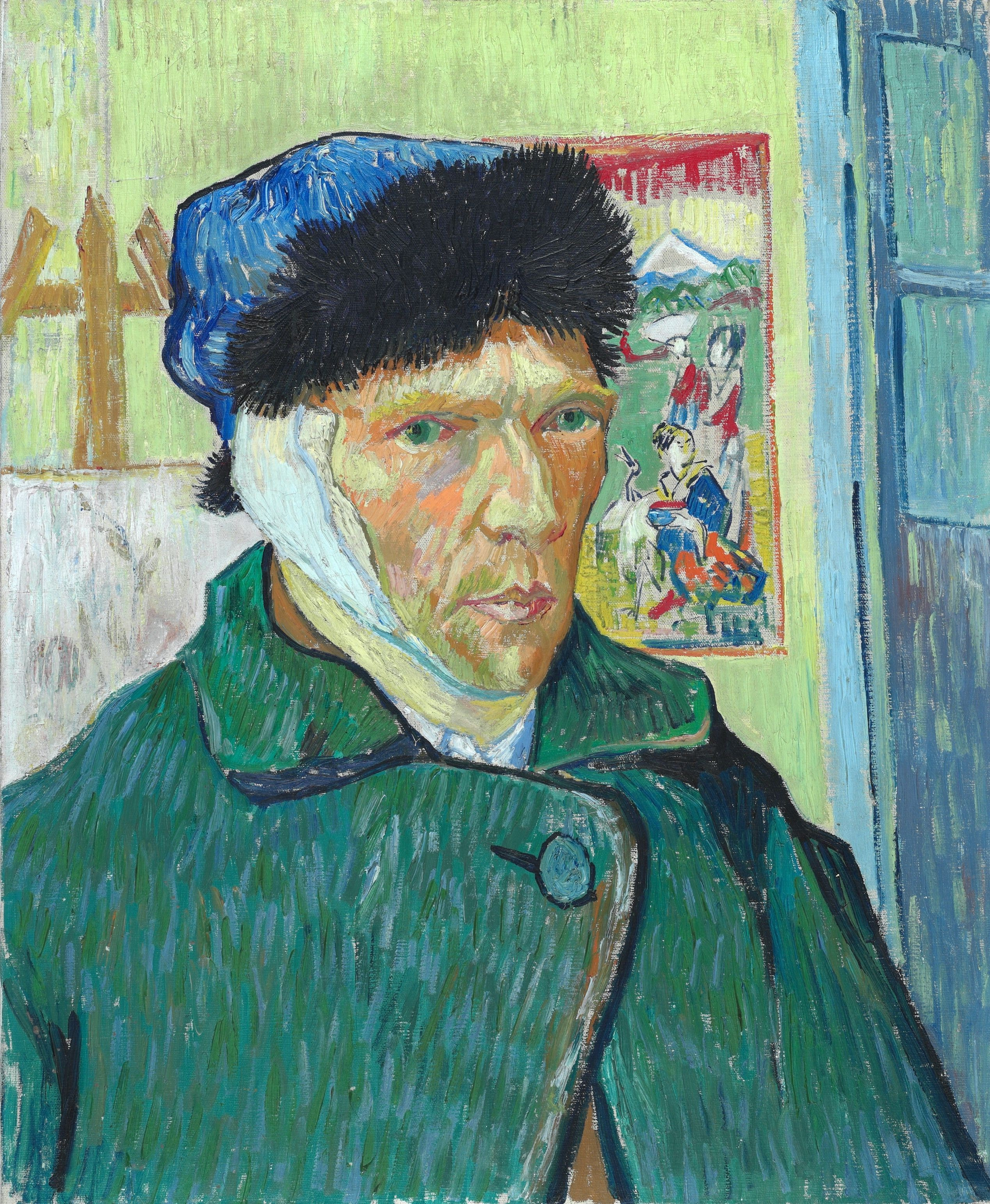
Self-Portrait with Bandaged Ear, by Vincent van Gogh; oil on canvas; Arles, January 1889

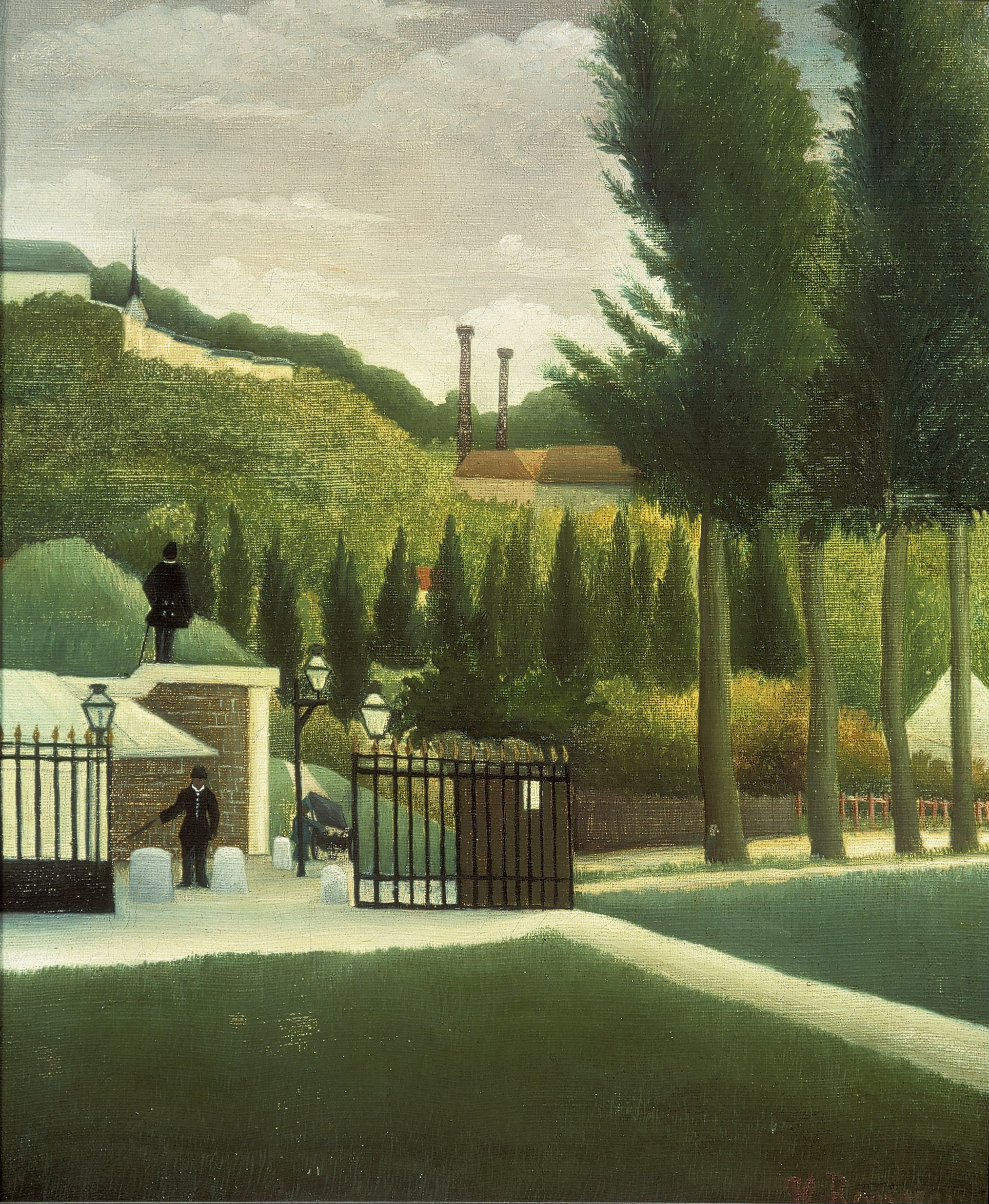
The Customs Post, c. 1890; by Henri Rousseau

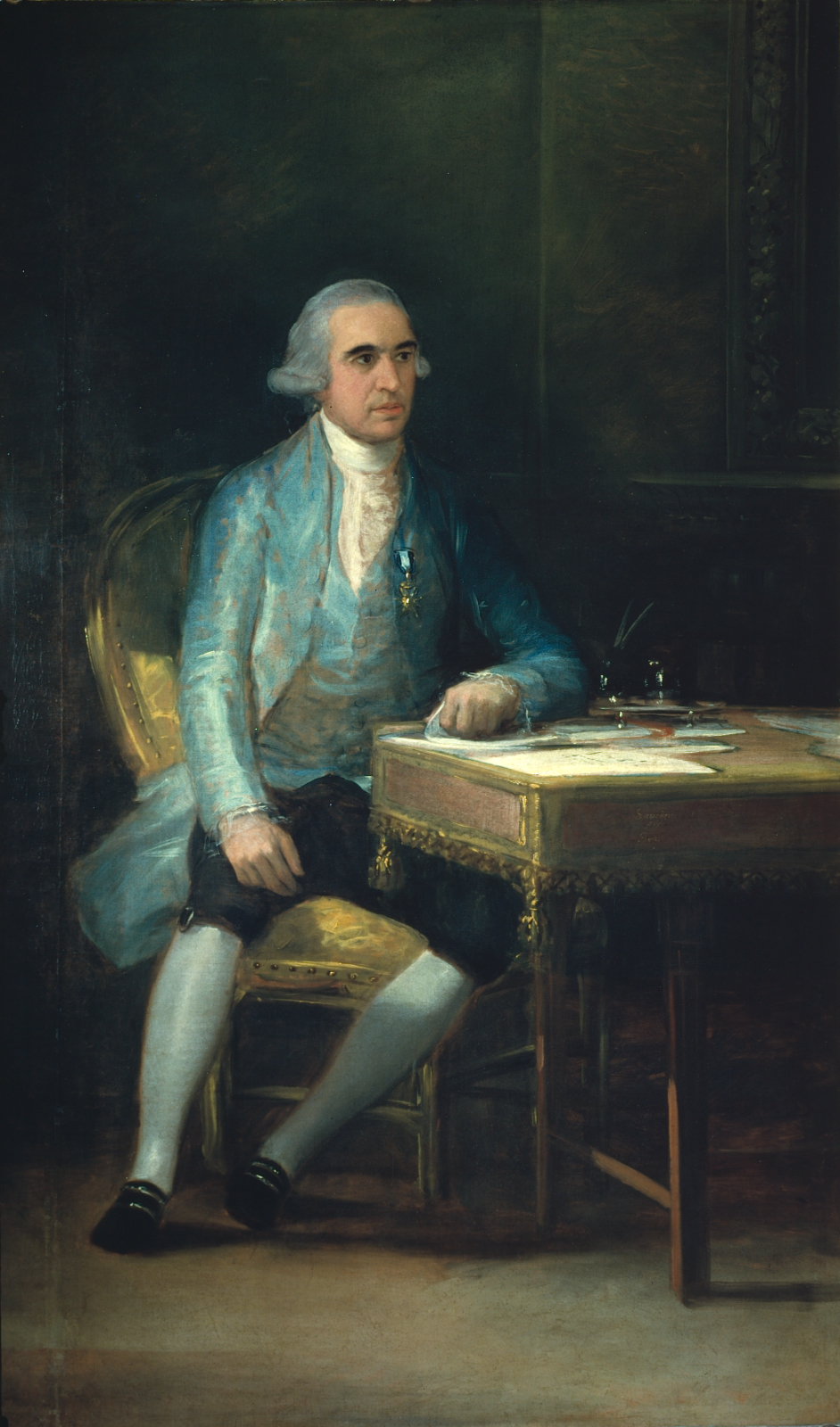
Portrait of Don Francisco de Saavedra, by Francisco Goya

Dutch School

- Vincent van Gogh – 3 paintings;

Early Netherlandish

- Robert Campin (or Master of Flemalle), the Seilern Triptych
- Quentin Matsys – 2 paintings;

English School

- William Beechey – 2 paintings;
- Thomas Gainsborough – 2 paintings;
- Peter Lely – 3 paintings;

Flemish School

- Anthony van Dyck – 5 paintings;
- Pieter Bruegel the Elder – 2 paintings, many drawings;
- Peter Paul Rubens – 29 paintings;
- David Teniers the Younger – 10 paintings;

French School

- Paul Cézanne – 12 paintings;
- Edgar Degas – 6 paintings;
- Paul Gauguin – 3 paintings;
- Claude Lorrain – 1 painting;
- Édouard Manet – 4 paintings;
- Claude Monet – 3 paintings;
- Camille Pissarro – 4 paintings;
- Alfred Sisley – 2 paintings;
- Georges-Pierre Seurat – 9 paintings;
- Pierre-Auguste Renoir – 4 paintings;
- Chaïm Soutine – 1 painting;
- Henri de Toulouse-Lautrec – 2 paintings;
- Henri Rousseau – 1 painting;

German School

- Lucas Cranach the Elder – 1 painting;

Italian School

- Fra Angelico – 4 paintings;
- Giovanni Bellini – 1 painting;
- Sandro Botticelli – 1 painting;
- Bernardo Daddi – 2 paintings;
- Lorenzo Lotto – 2 paintings;
- Lorenzo Monaco – 2 paintings;
- Pietro Perugino – 1 painting;
- Pesellino – a diptych
- Parmigianino – 2 paintings;
- Giovanni Battista Tiepolo – 12 paintings;
- Tintoretto – 2 paintings;

Spanish School

- Francisco Goya – 1 painting;

== Gambier-Parry Collection ==
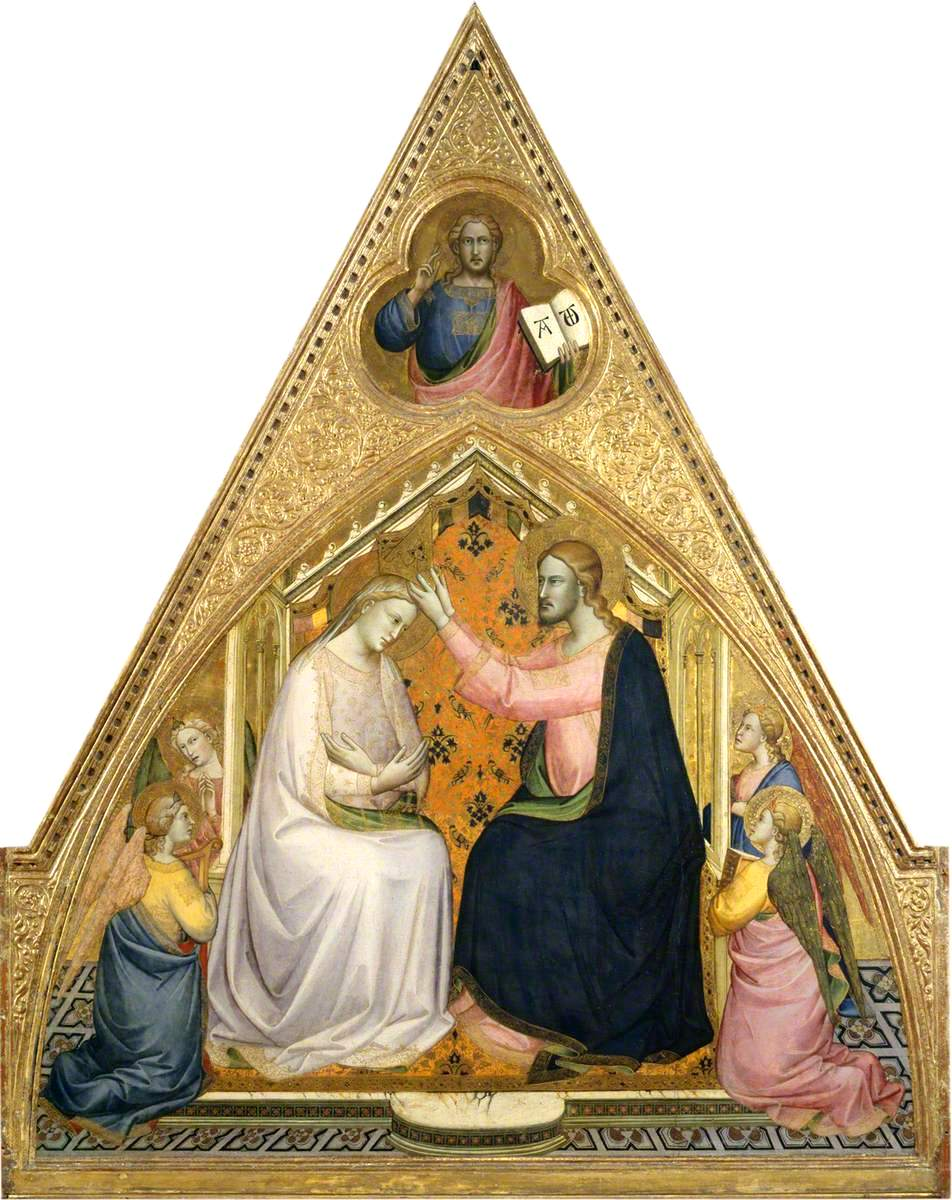
Lorenzo Monaco, Coronation of the Virgin, 1388–1390

Thomas Gambier Parry (1816–1888) was a keen and versatile collector for most of his adult life. Many of his purchases were made on trips to the continent, especially Italy, but he also bought from dealers and auctions in England, and sometimes sold items.

His most important collections were of late medieval and Early Renaissance paintings, small sculpted reliefs, ivories, and maiolica, but he also had a significant early collection of Islamic metalwork, and a variety of other types of objects, for example Hispano-Moresque ware, glass and three small post-Byzantine wooden crosses from Mount Athos elaborately carved with miniature scenes.

The Courtauld Gallery website shows images and descriptions of 324 objects from the 1966 bequest, which included the bulk of the collection.

Gambier Parry began by collecting mostly 16th- and 17th-century works, but his focus gradually moved to 14th- and 15th-century works, still relatively little collected, although Prince Albert was among British collectors of "Italian Primitives", as Trecento paintings were then known. Among his most important paintings were a Coronation of the Virgin by Lorenzo Monaco, one of the larger works in the collection, three predella panels with roundels of Christ and saints by Fra Angelico, and a small but important diptych of the Annunciation by Pesellino. There are two further predella panels by Lorenzo Monaco, and many other small panels by lesser-known masters. Later Renaissance works include ones by Il Garofalo, Sassoferrato, and there is a Baroque Assumption by Francesco Solimena. There are a number of illuminated manuscript pages from the workshop of the Boucicaut Master.

The sculptures include three fine 15th-century marble reliefs of the Virgin and Child, the most significant by Mino da Fiesole. There is a Limoges enamel book cover panel, a number of Renaissance Limoges items, and several small Gothic ivories.

== Gallery ==
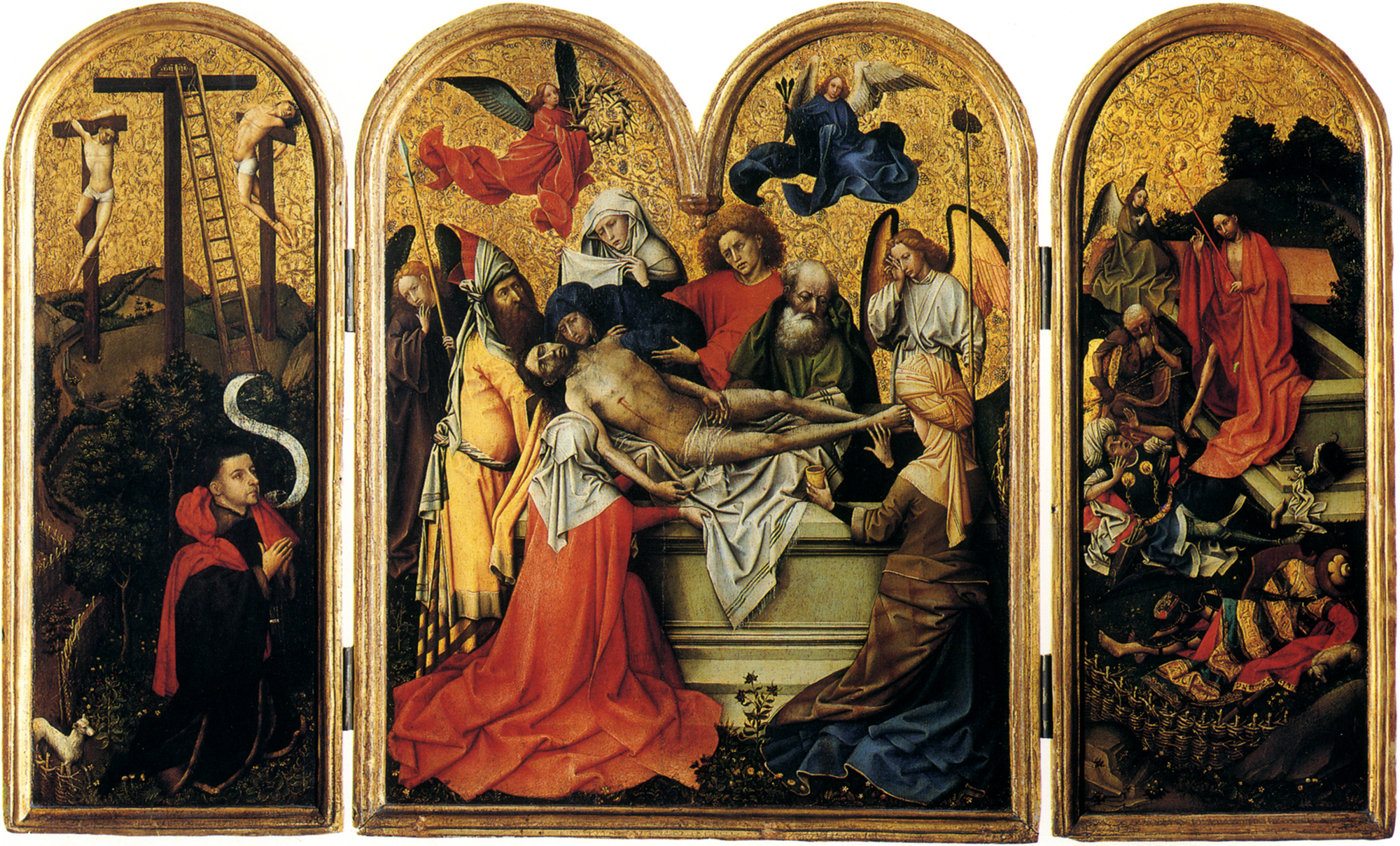
Robert Campin, Seilern Triptych, c. 1425

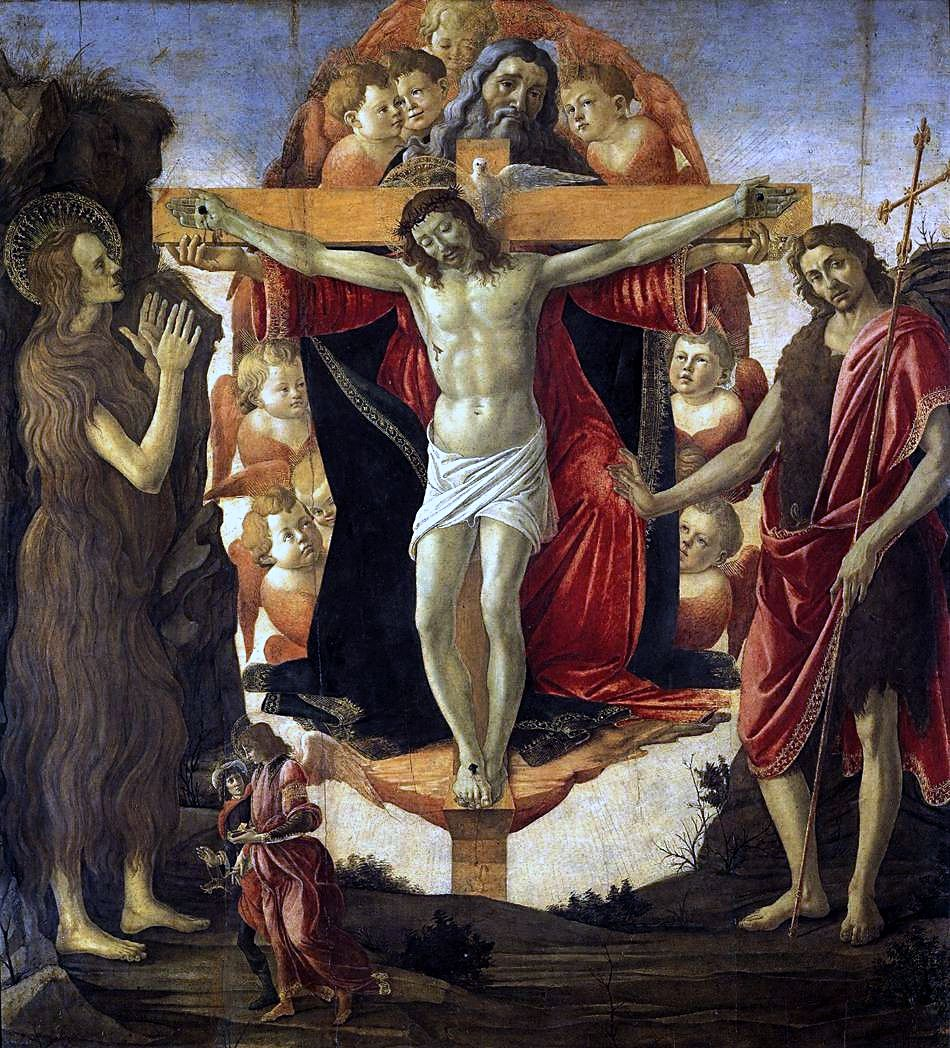
Sandro Botticelli, Holy Trinity with Mary Magdalene, John the Baptist and Tobias and the Angel (Pala della Convertite), 1491–1493

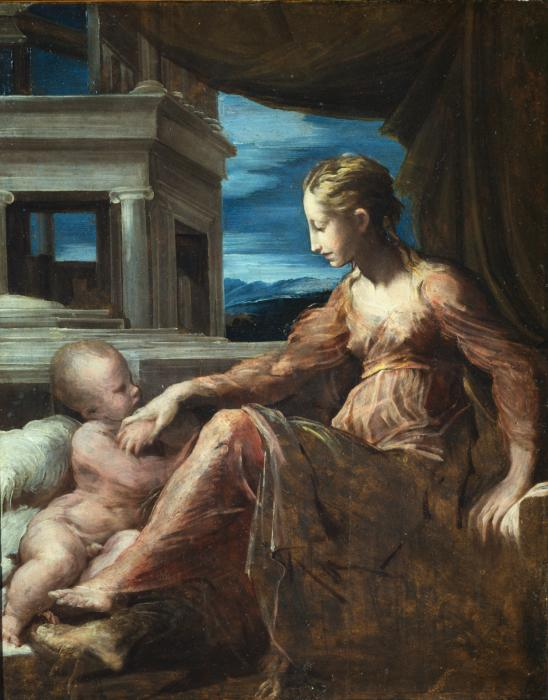
Parmigianino, Virgin and Child, 1525–1527

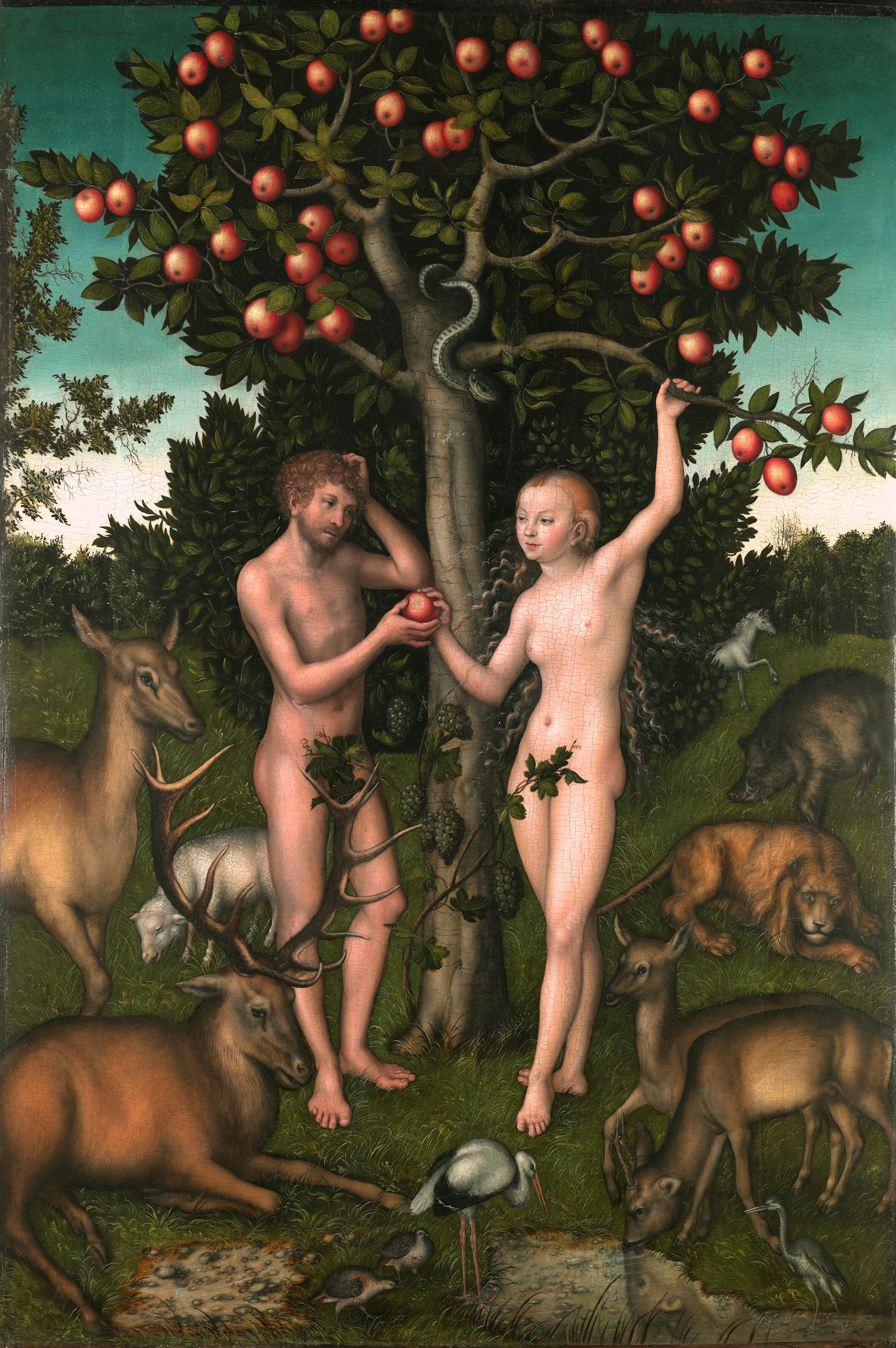
Lucas Cranach the Elder, Adam and Eve, 1526

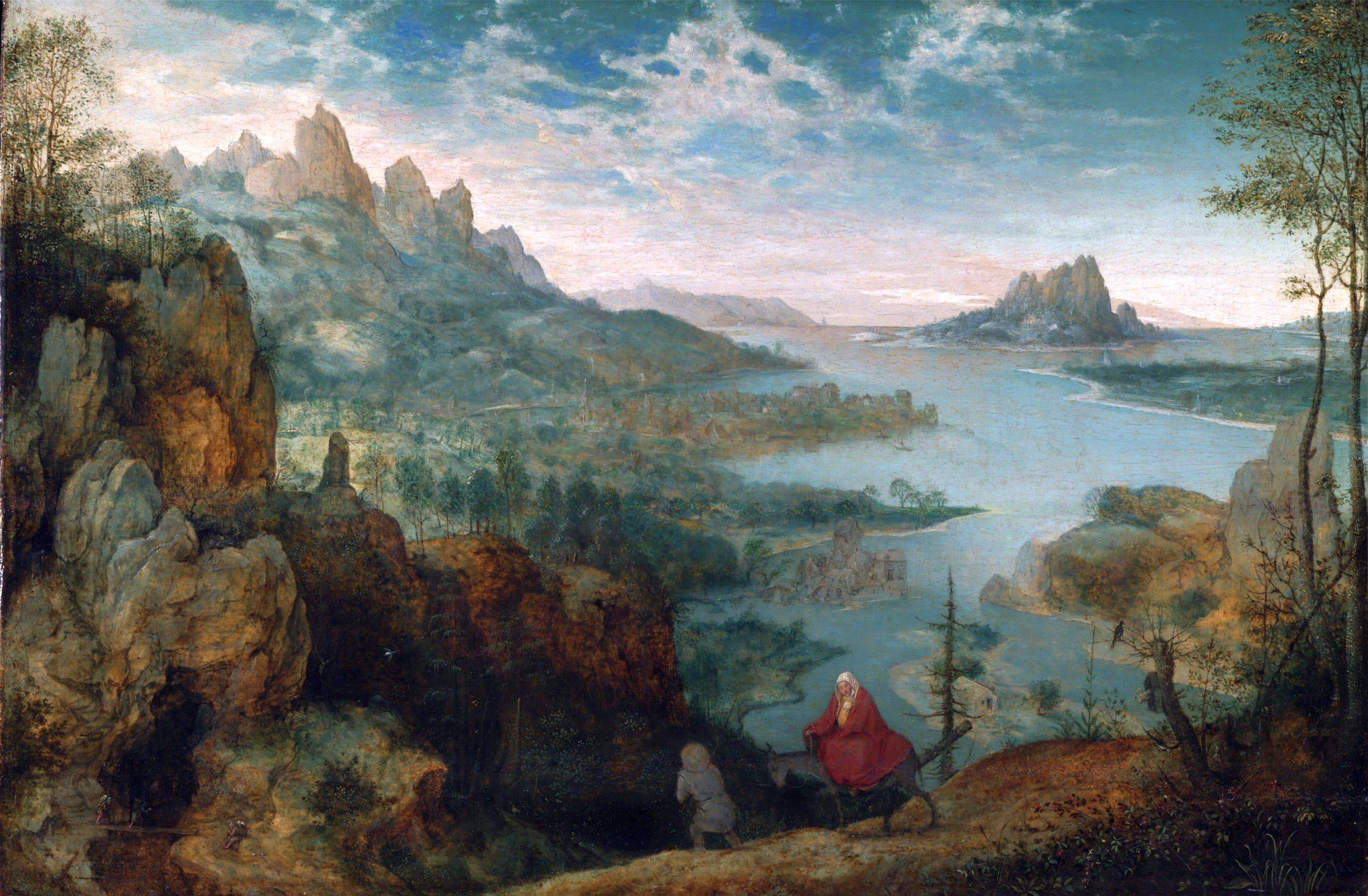
Pieter Bruegel the Elder, Landscape with the Flight into Egypt, 1563

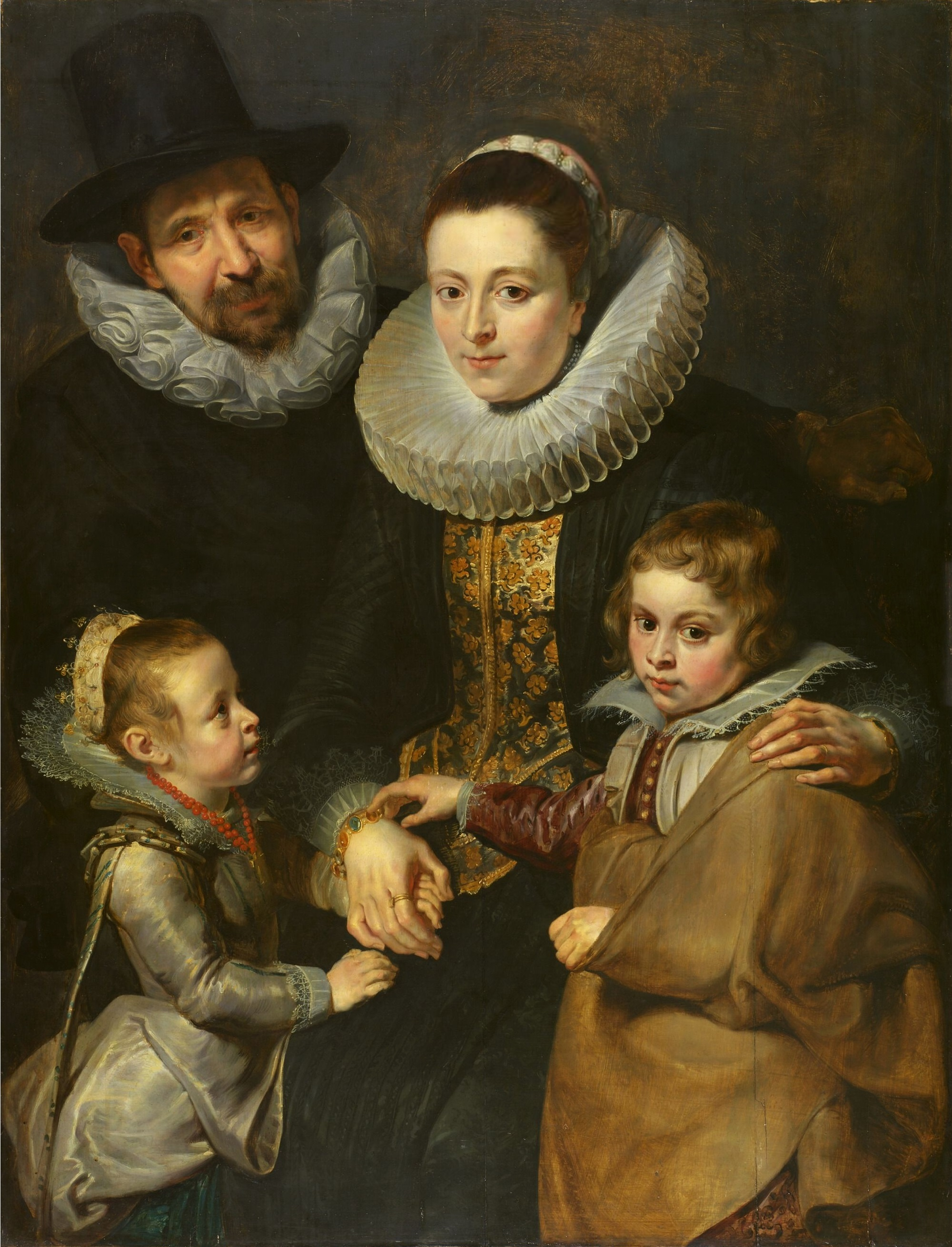
Peter Paul Rubens, The Family of Jan Brueghel the Elder, 1613–1615

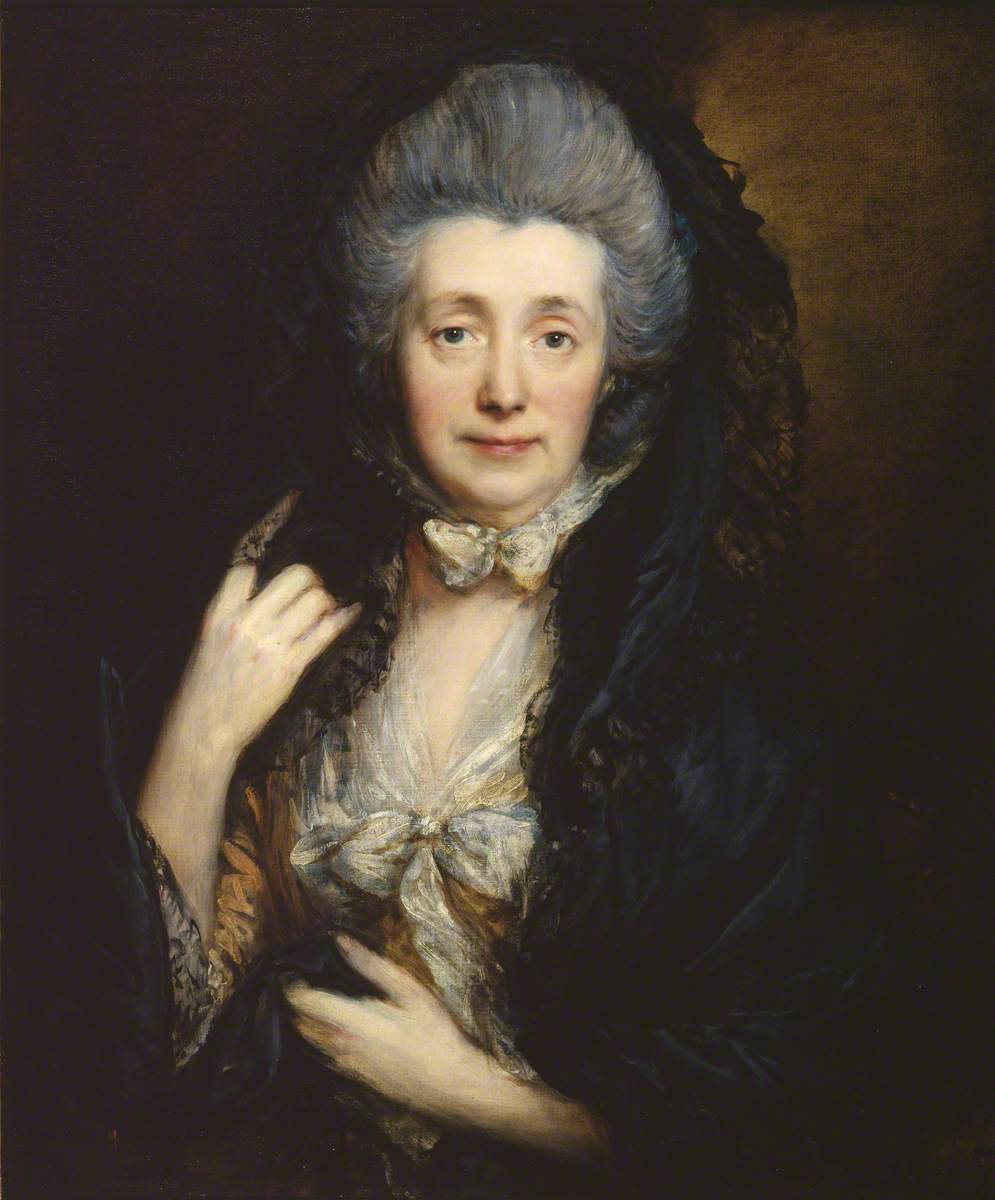
Thomas Gainsborough, Portrait of Margaret Gainsborough, 1778

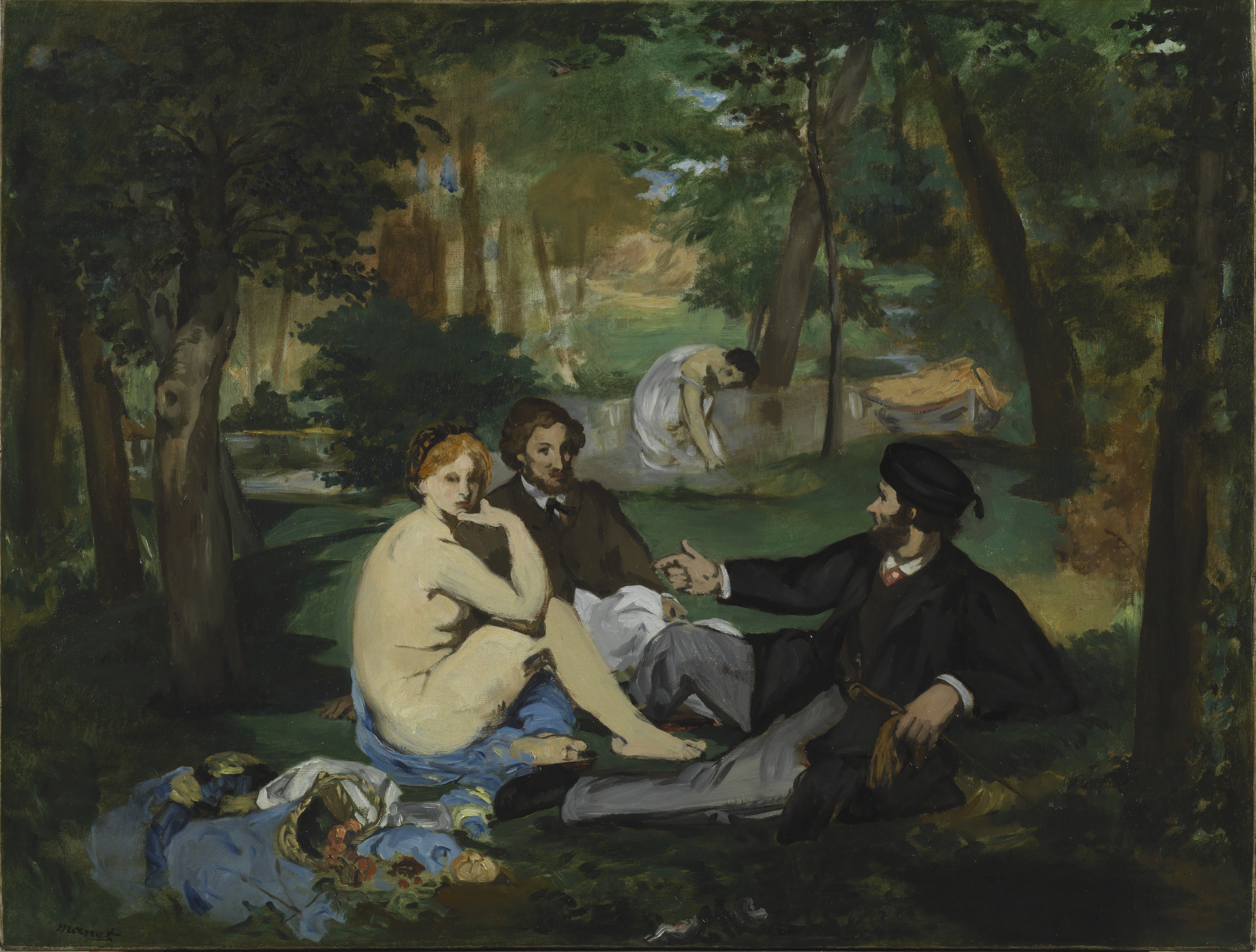
Édouard Manet, The Luncheon on the Grass, c. 1863–1868

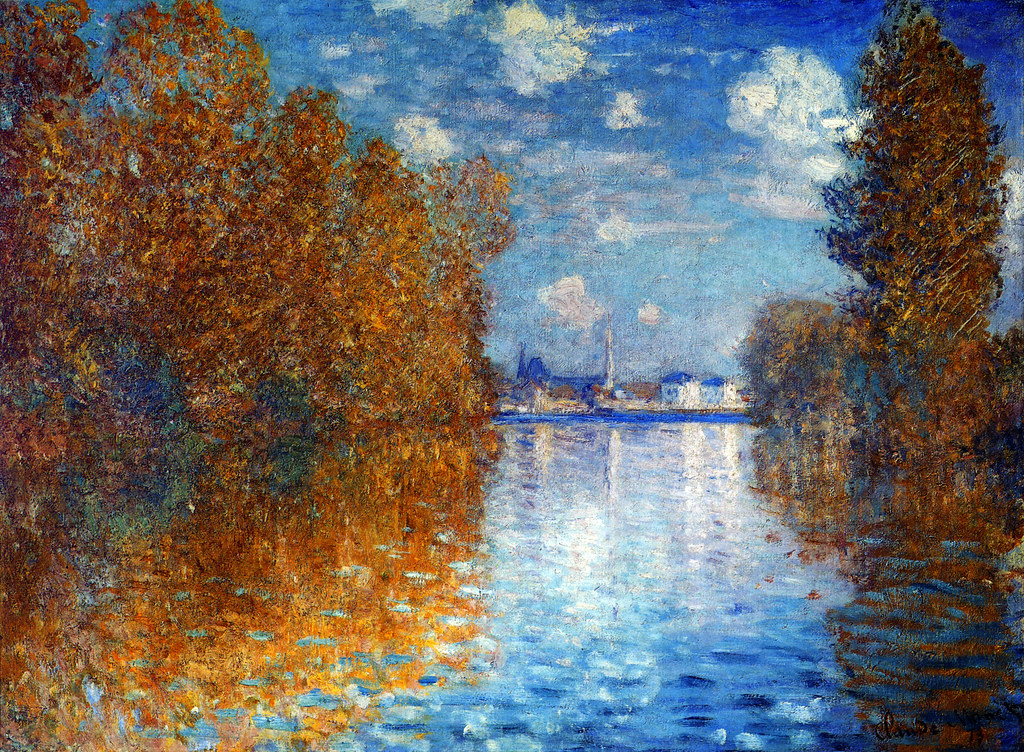
Claude Monet, Autumn Effect at Argenteuil, 1873

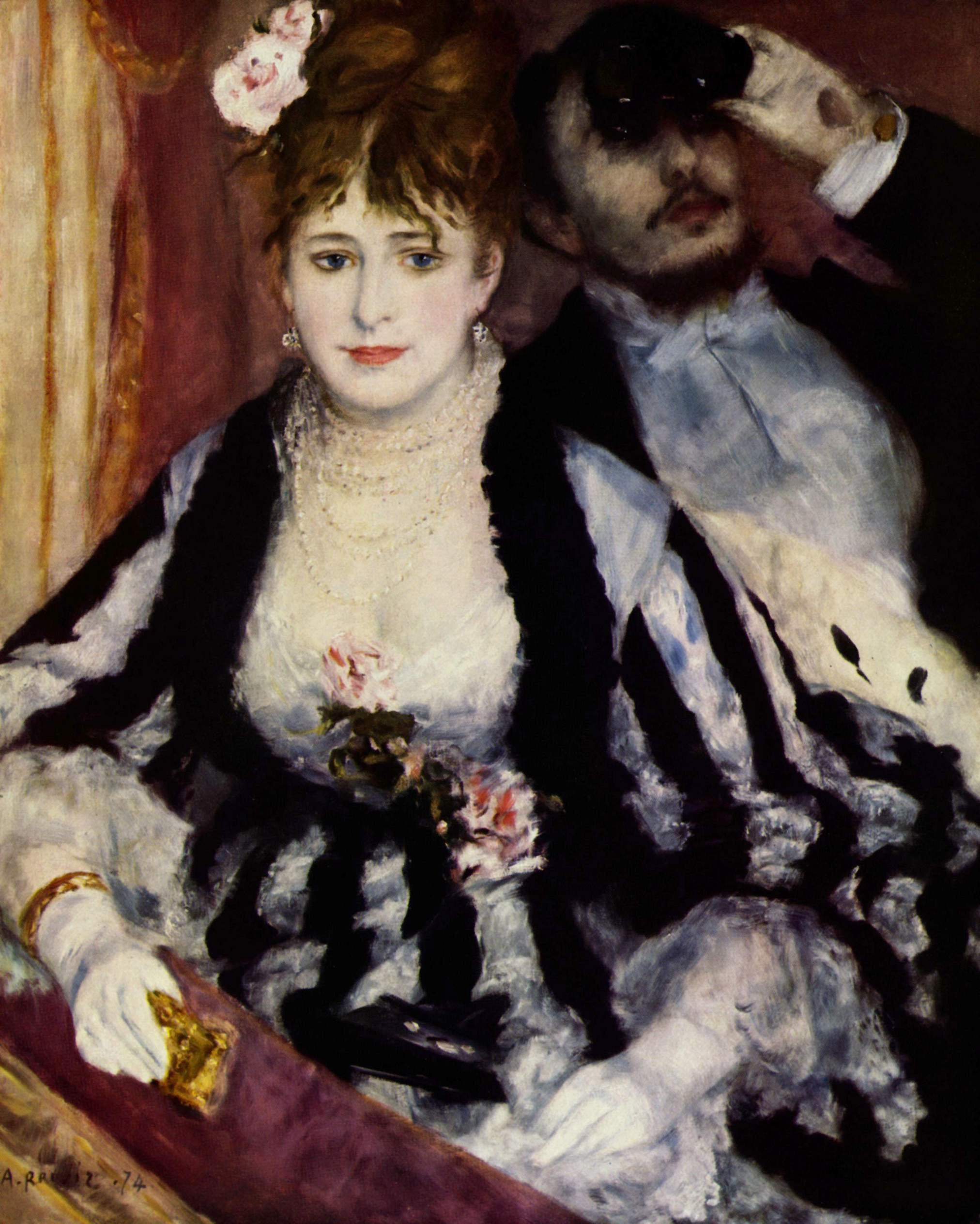
Pierre-Auguste Renoir, The Theater Box, 1874

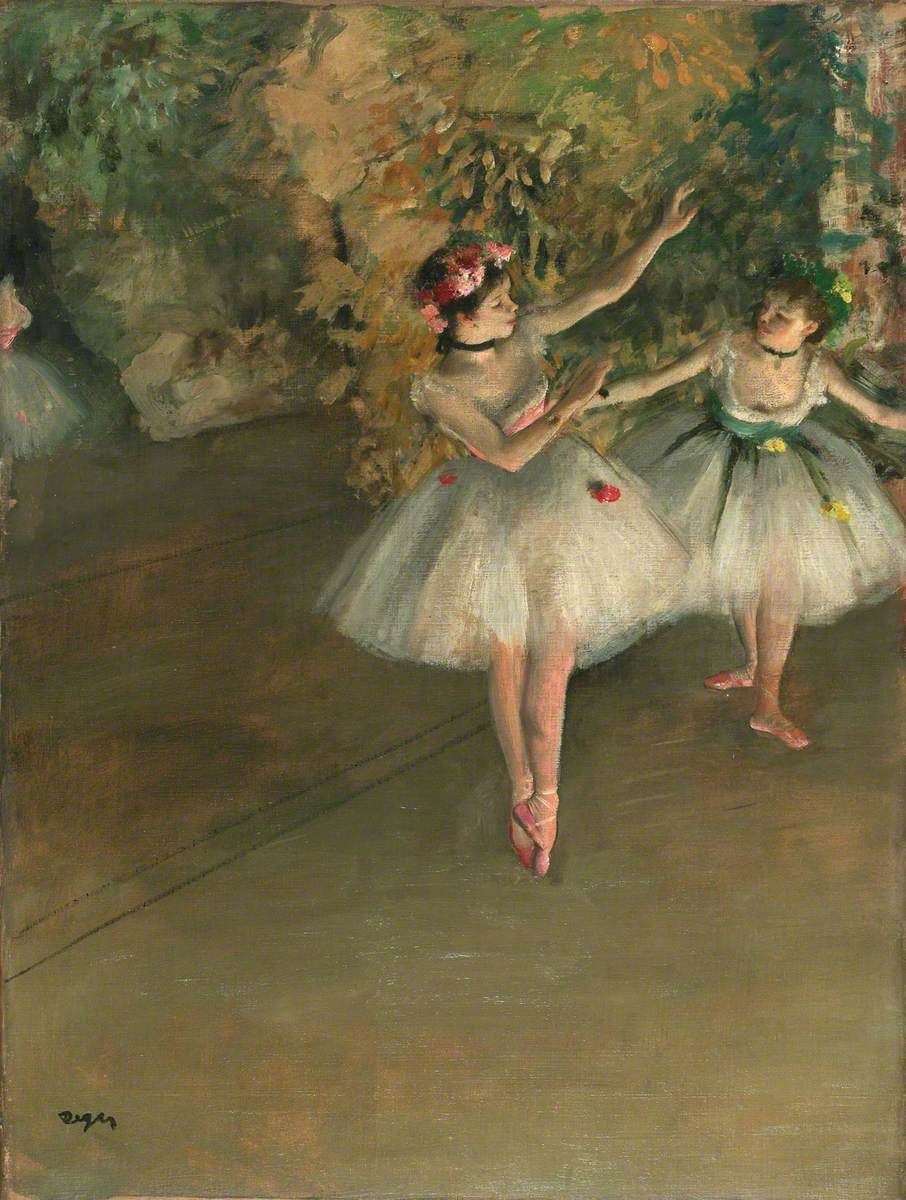
Edgar Degas, Two Dancers on a Stage, 1874

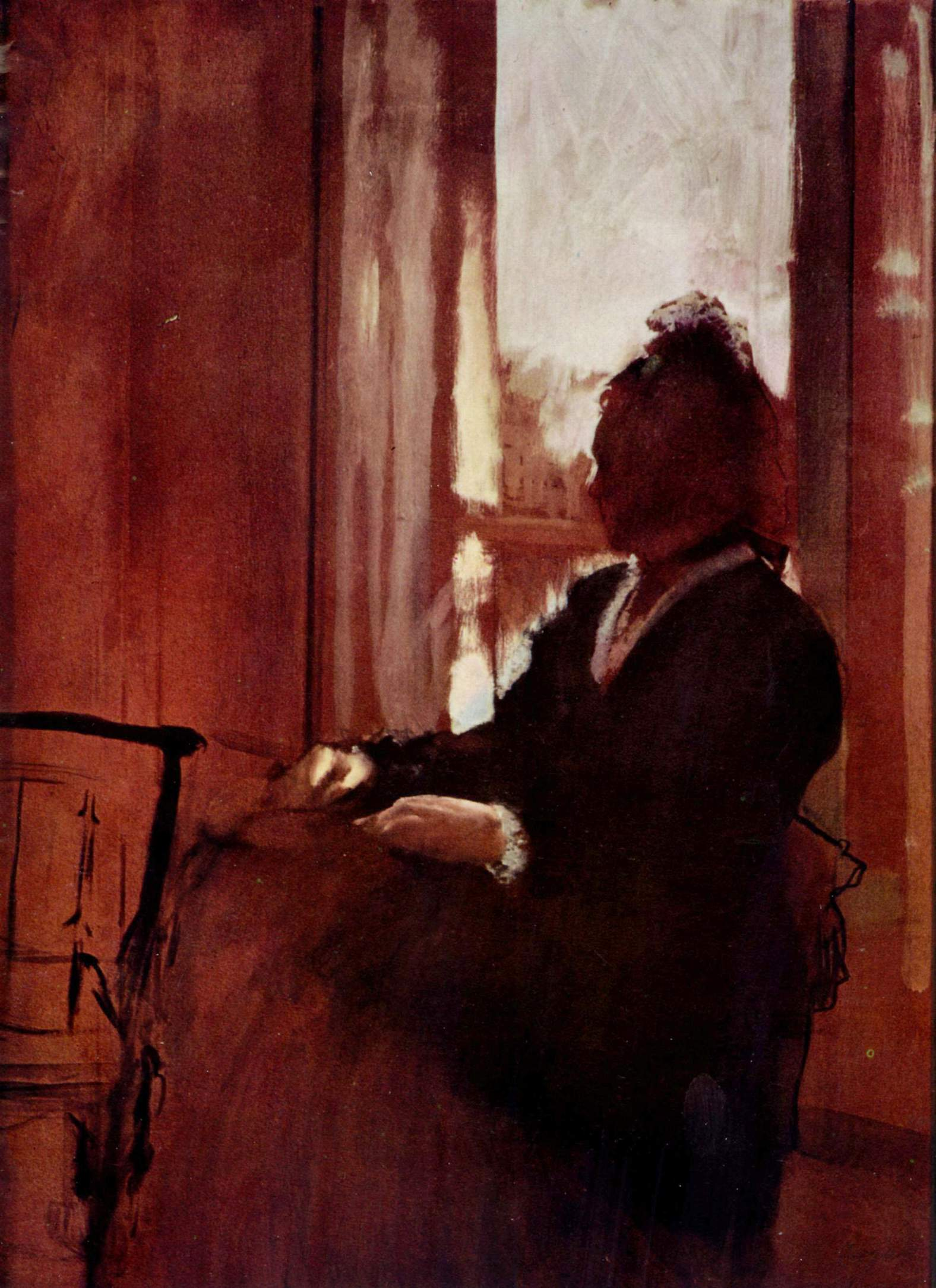
Edgar Degas, Woman at a Window, 1875–1878

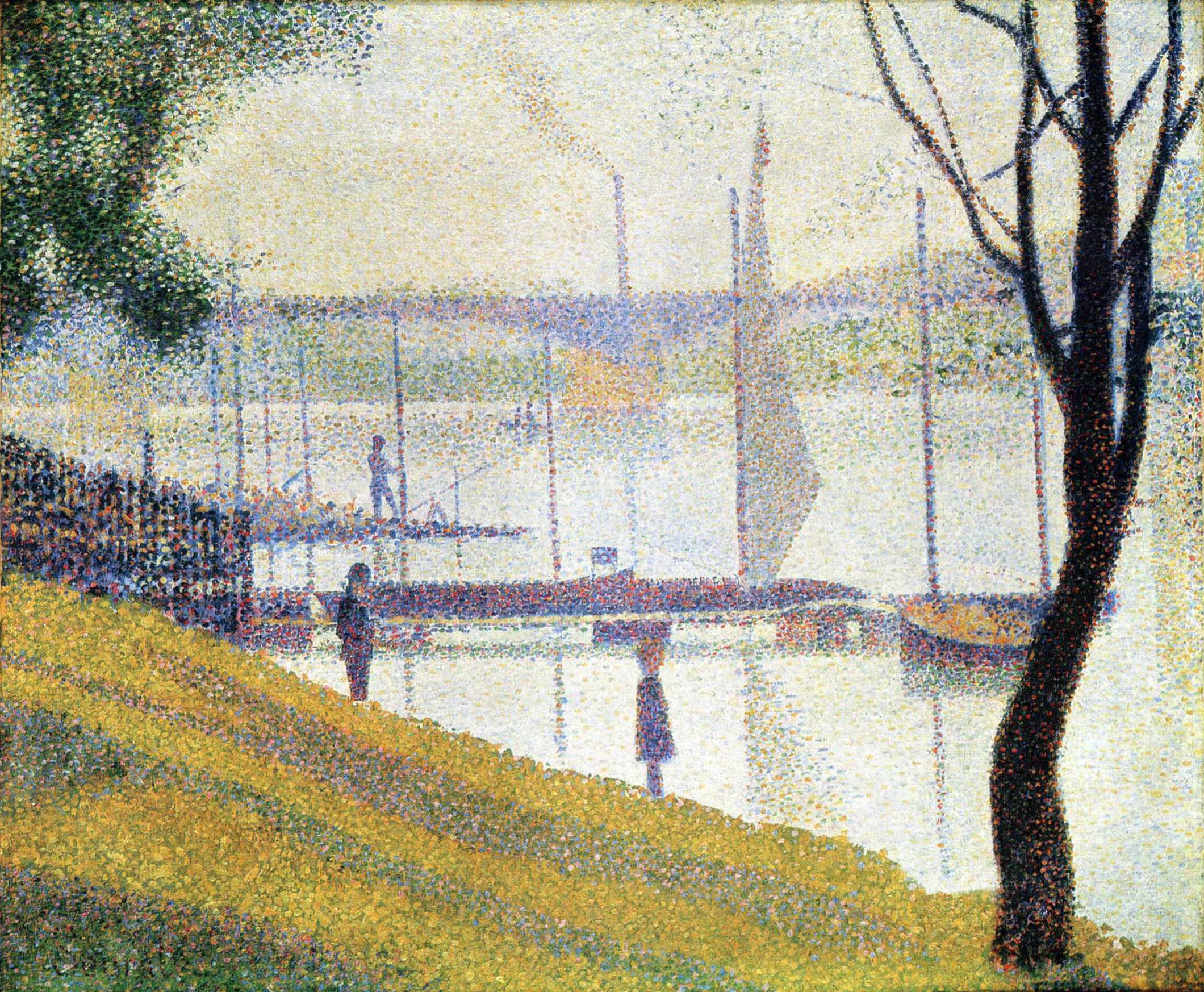
Georges Seurat, Bridge of Courbevoie, 1886–1887

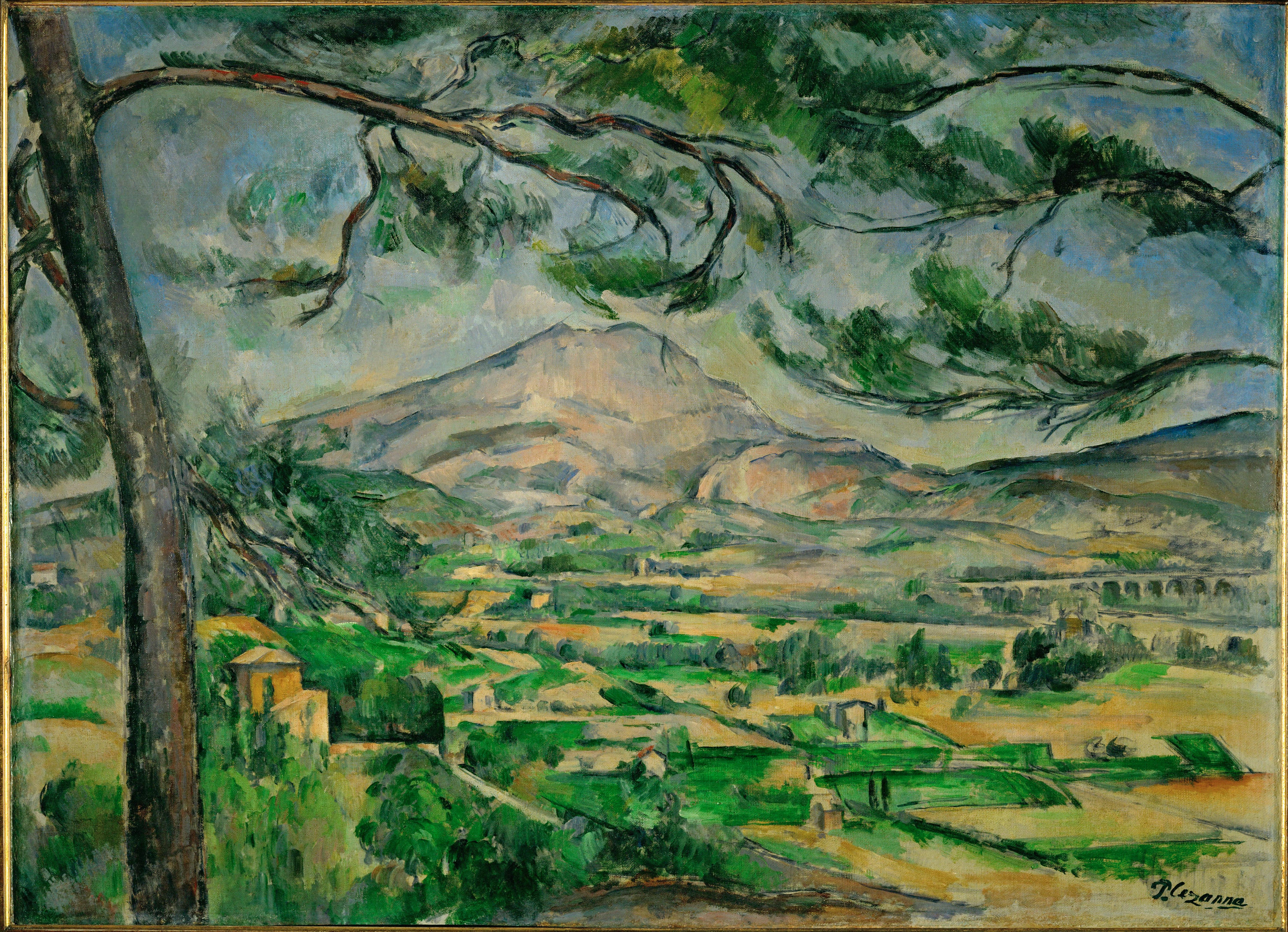
Paul Cézanne, Mont Sainte-Victoire with Large Pine, c. 1887

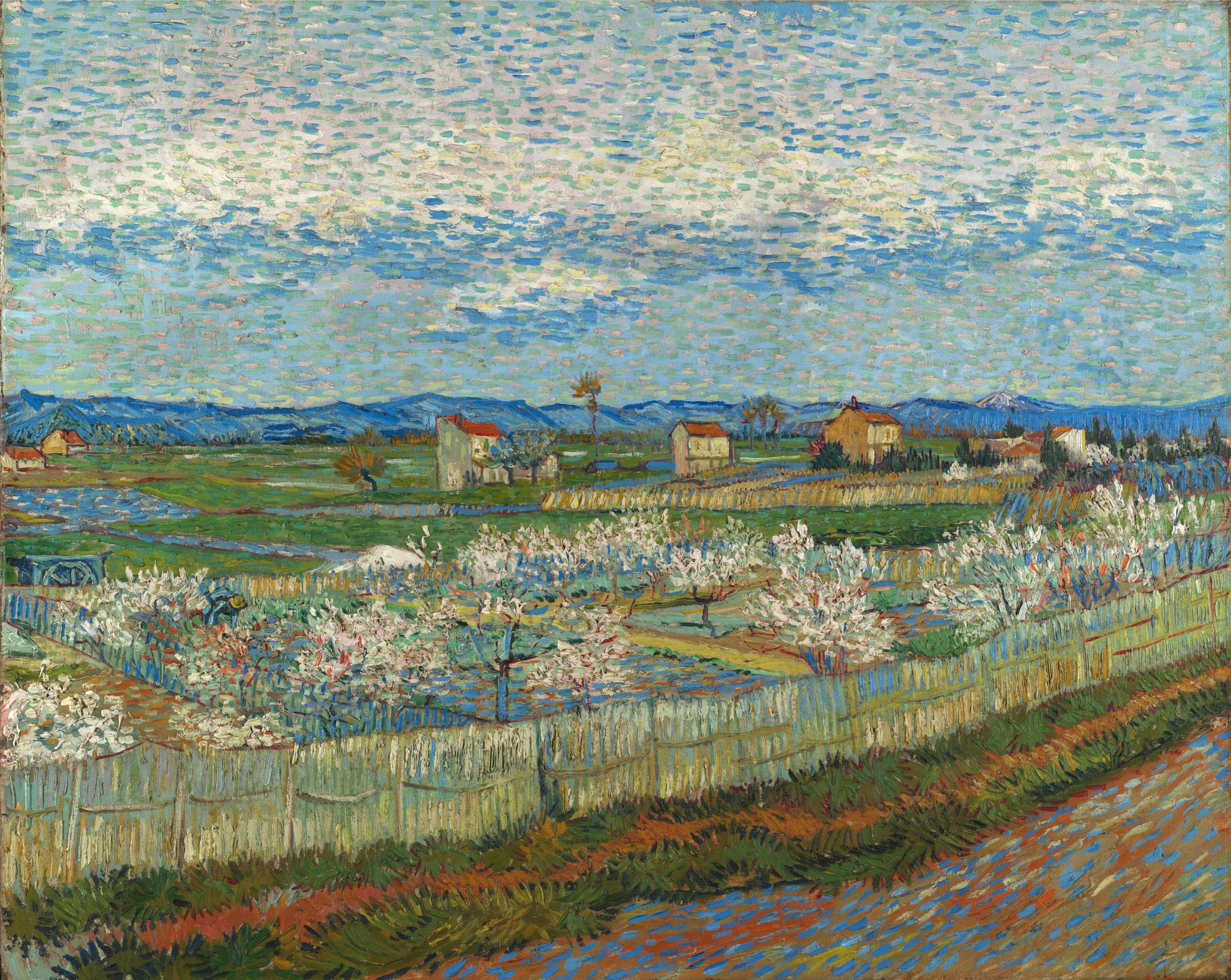
Vincent van Gogh, Peach Trees in Blossom, April, 1889

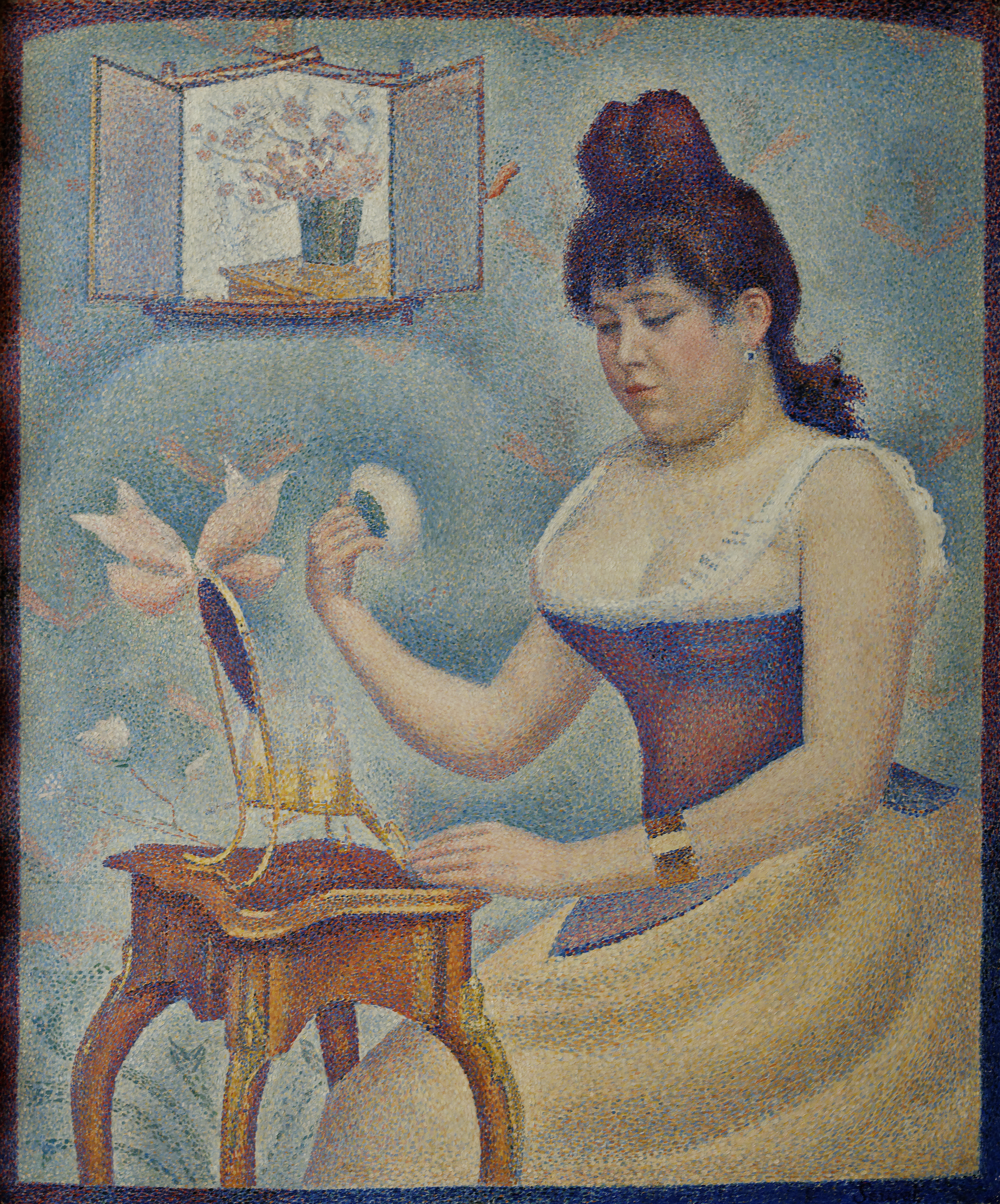
Georges Seurat, Young Woman Powdering Herself, 1889–1890

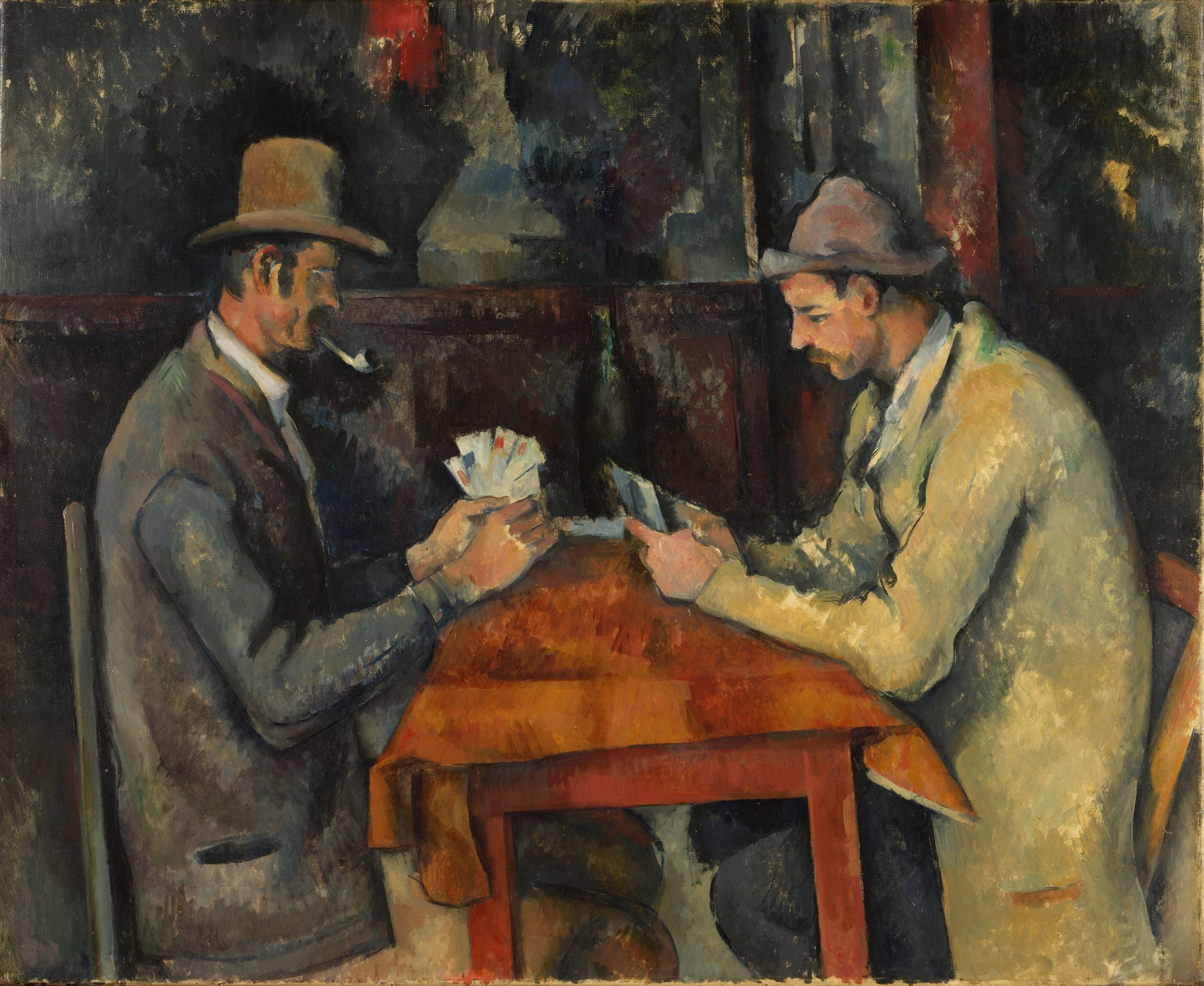
Paul Cézanne, The Card Players, 1892–1895

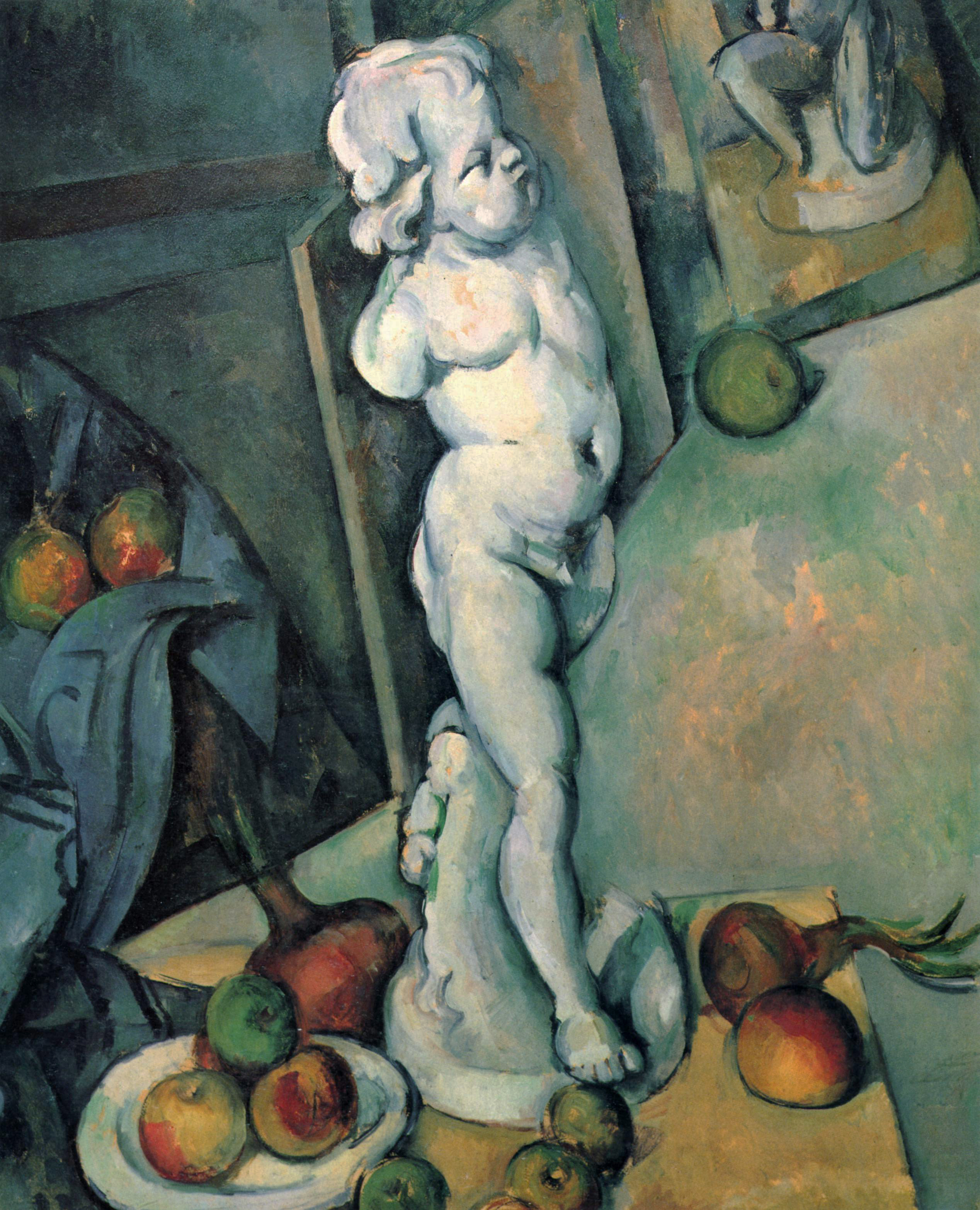
Paul Cézanne, Still Life with Cherub, 1895

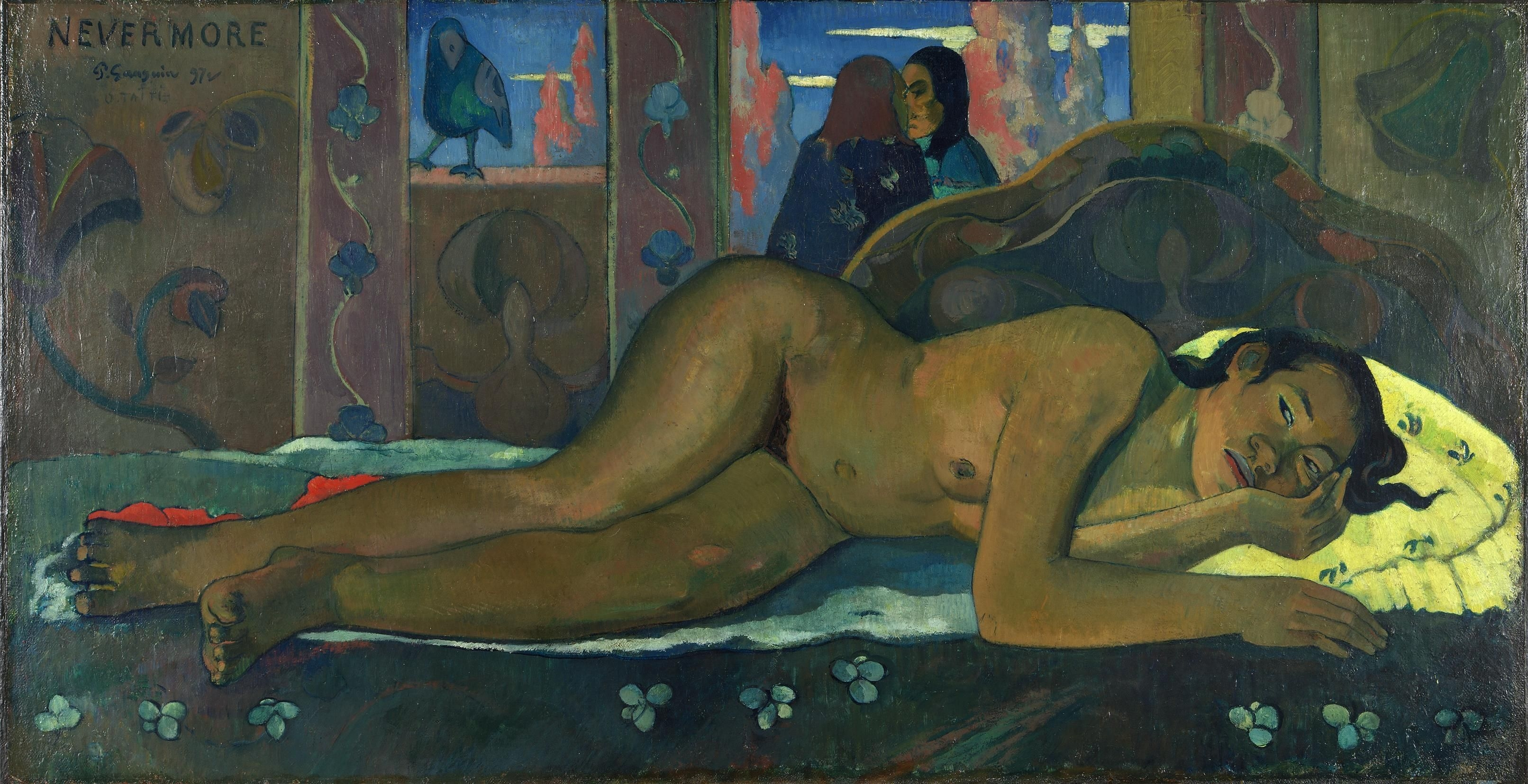
Paul Gauguin, Nevermore (O Taiti), 1897

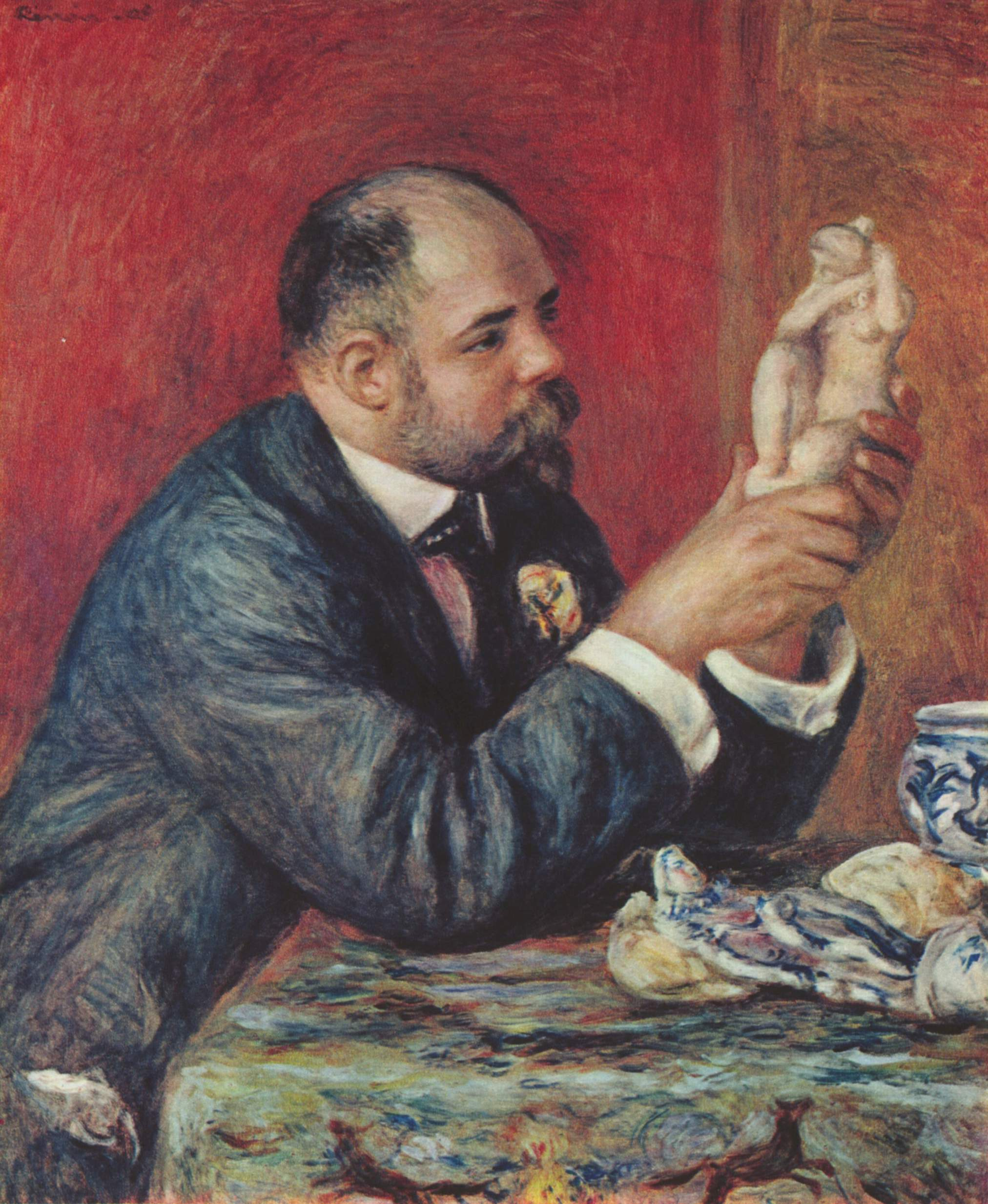
Pierre-Auguste Renoir, Portrait of Ambroise Vollard, 1908

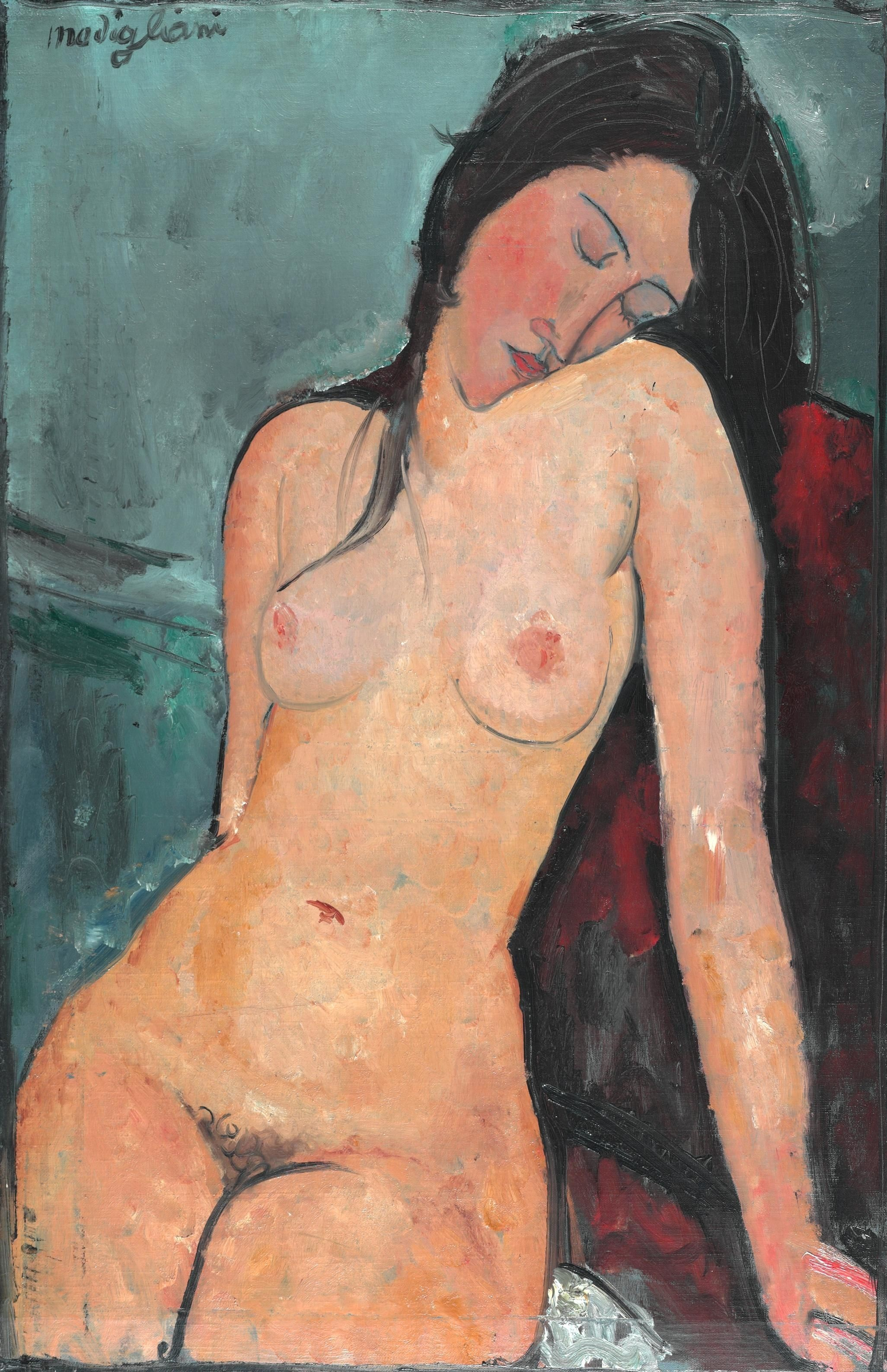
Amedeo Modigliani, Female Nude, 1916

Queen's Road Station, Bayswater by Walter Sickert, 1916

== Resources ==
In April 2023 the Courtauld completed a five-year project to digitise the Conway Library photographic collection and make more than one million images freely accessible online. The project, supported by the National Lottery Heritage Fund and involving thousands of volunteers, catalogued photographs of global architecture, sculpture, paintings and decorative arts dating from the beginnings of photography to the present day, many of which had not previously been publicly accessible. The digitised photographs are available through the Courtauld’s online photographic collections database.

In September 2023 the Courtauld Gallery launched its collection online for the first time, providing public access to more than 33,000 objects ranging from the Middle Ages to the twenty-first century, including paintings, drawings, ceramics and sculpture. The database forms part of a broader programme of digital access to the Institute’s photographic and art collections and can be explored through the Courtauld Gallery’s online collections platform.

Subsequent digitisation projects have extended this initiative: by 2025 the Courtauld had completed the digitisation of the Witt Photographic Collection, making more than two million images of Western art spanning the thirteenth century to the present freely available online.

Two other websites courtauldprints.com sell photographic prints to the general public.
