= Ernst Vegelin =

Head of the Courtauld Gallery in London

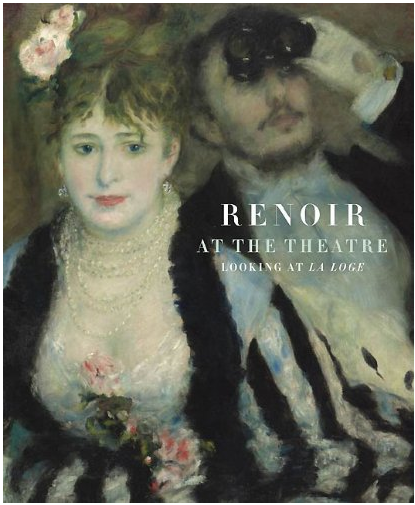
The cover of Renoir at the Theatre Looking at La Loge, 2008.

Jhr. Dr. Ernst Vegelin van Claerbergen (born 10 September 1969, Arnhem) is Head of the Courtauld Gallery, London.

== Selected publications ==
- David Teniers and the theatre of painting. London: Courtauld Institute of Art, 2006. (Editor) ISBN 978 1903470497
- Renoir at the theatre: looking at La loge. London: Courtauld Gallery in association with Paul Holberton Pub., 2008. (Editor) ISBN 978 1903470732
