= Self-Portrait with Bandaged Ear =

1889 self-portrait by Vincent van Gogh

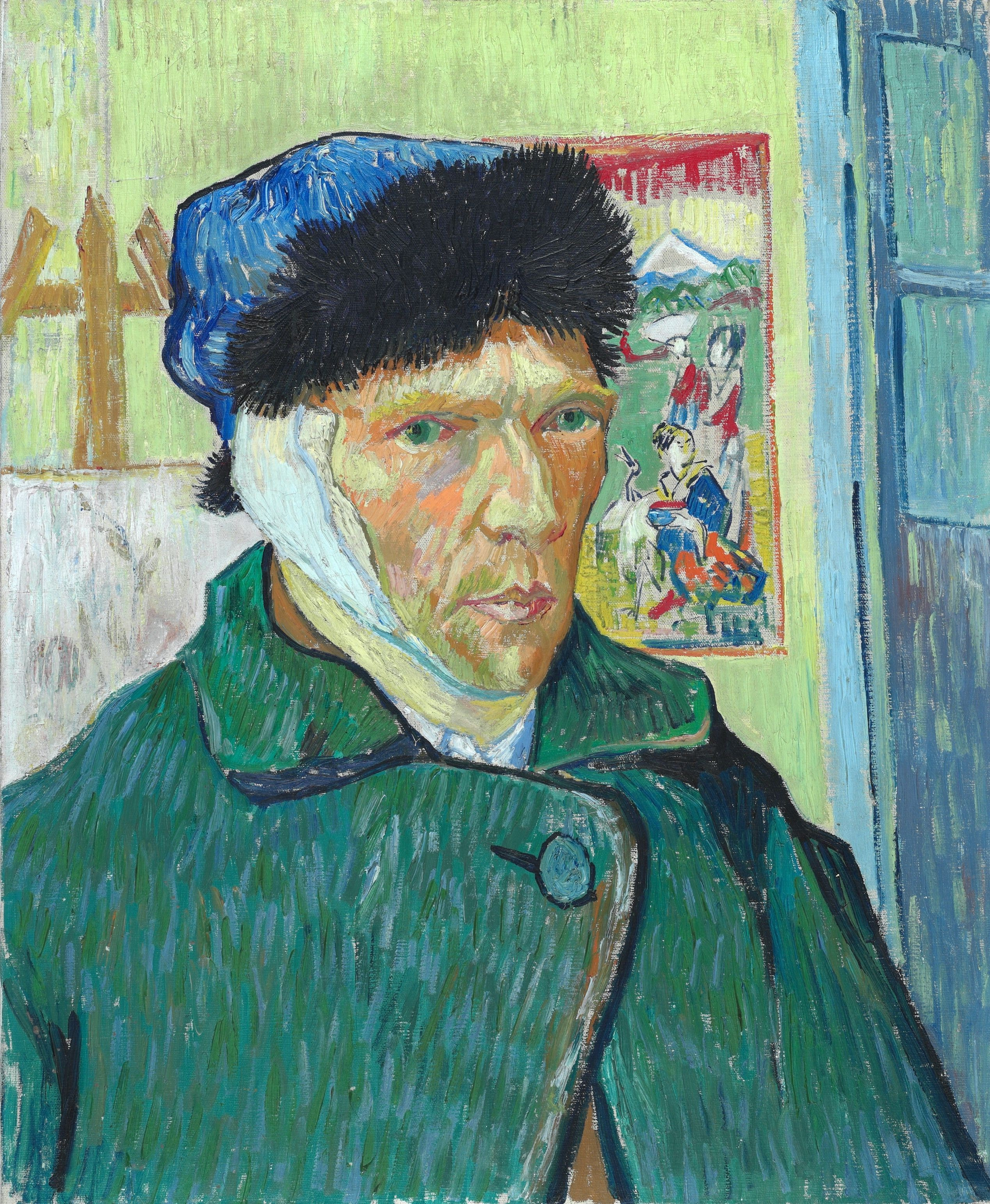
- Artist: Vincent van Gogh
- Year: January 1889
- Catalogue: F527; JH1657
- Medium: oil on canvas
- Dimensions: 60 cm × 49 cm (24 in × 19 in)
- Location: Courtauld Gallery, London

Self-Portrait with Bandaged Ear is an 1889 self-portrait by Dutch Post-Impressionist artist Vincent van Gogh. The painting is in the collection of the Courtauld Institute of Art and on display in the Gallery at Somerset House. The painting includes inspiration from Japanese woodblock printing.

== About the painting ==
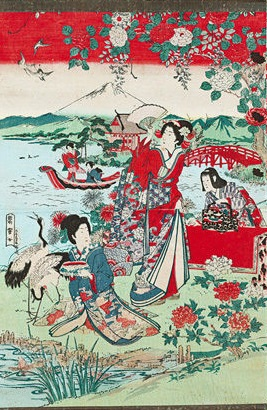
Geishas in a Landscape, 1870s Japanese print, a partial copy of which is on the wall in the painting

In this self-portrait, Van Gogh portrays himself in a blue cap with black fur and a green overcoat with a bandage covering his ear and extending under his chin. Behind him is an open window, a canvas on an easel, with a few indistinguishable marks, as well as a Japanese woodblock print, Geishas in a Landscape made by Satō Torakiyo in the 1870s.

The fur cap pictured in the portrait serves as a memory of the difficult working circumstances he encountered in January 1889. The cap had been recently purchased to keep his heavy bandage in place and protect him from the winter cold.

Van Gogh used Impasto painting strokes, a technique where paint is laid thickly on a surface to show marks of the painting knife, to give the composition more energy and passion. He was inspired by Adolphe Monticelli's use of impasto in his own paintings as illustrated by the letter he wrote to his brother, Theo, in 1888.

Van Gogh had moved from Paris to Arles to establish a community of supportive artists called the Studio of the South. After renting four rooms in The Yellow House, he invited Paul Gauguin to join him.

On evening of 23 December 1888, Gauguin threatened to leave and Van Gogh approached him with a razor. Later that night, he sliced off his own left ear, which is not apparent in the portrait since he used a mirror to paint it, making it seem like the right ear is bandaged instead, and brought it to a prostitute in Arles named Gabriel Berlatier, who worked as a cleaner at a brothel Van Gogh and Gauguin both frequented at the time.

== History ==
In a 17 January 1889 letter to his brother Theo, Van Gogh mentioned he had made a new self-portrait, which is believed to be this one.

At the time of Van Gogh's death, this painting was in the possession of Julien (Père) Tanguy, although it was unclear how he had obtained it. Tanguy had posed twice for Van Gogh in 1887. It was exhibited in Paris 1901 and 1905 in a major Van Gogh retrospective. In 1928 Samuel Courtauld purchased it and it is currently in the collection of the Courtauld Gallery in London.

== Japanese art influence ==
The art of woodblock printing in Japan was of great influence for Van Gogh as he was a big collector of many Japanese pieces. Throughout his lifetime, he had collected hundreds of Japanese prints, including Geishas in a Landscape by Torakiyo Sato, which was then used as inspiration for the copy in the background of this portrait.

Van Gogh's interest in Japanese art guided him to modernize his own art style. He enjoyed the bold colors and spatial effects of the Japanese prints which prompted him to start using them in all of his work including this portrait.

== See also ==
- List of works by Vincent van Gogh
