= St Joseph's Church, Pont-Aven =

Church in Finistère, France

Coordinates: 47.8561°N 3.7486°W

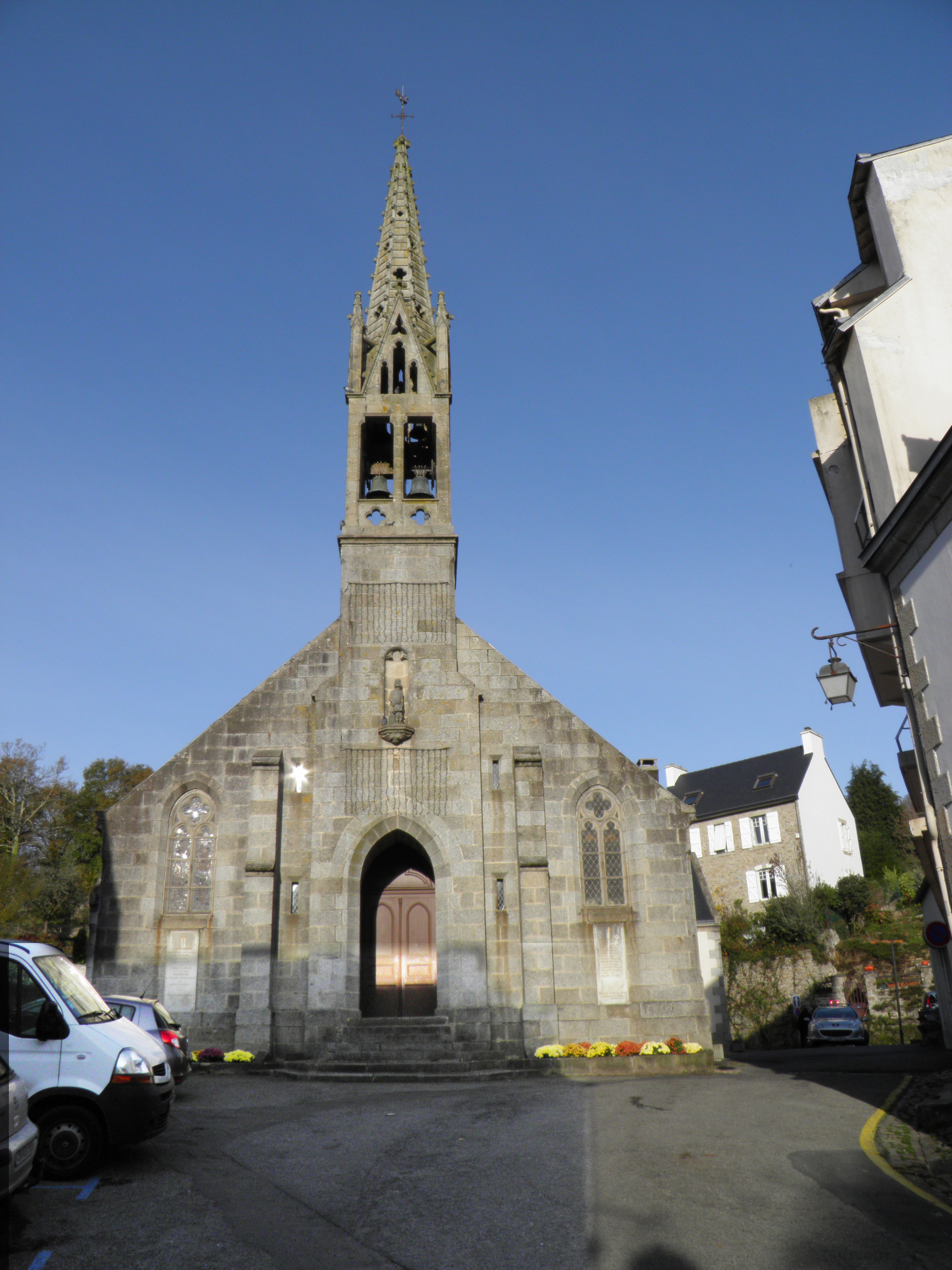
Pont-Aven Parish

St Joseph's Church (French: Église paroissiale Saint-Joseph) is a parish church located in Pont-Aven in Brittany, France. There is an organized exposition of religious paintings and reproductions of paintings in the nearby Tremalo Chapel. As the church is adjacent to rue Émile Bernard, some of Émile Bernard's paintings are showcased there.

== History ==
- Dating: third quarter of the 19th century
- Years: 1874, 1875

This church constructed in the place of the old church of Pont-Aven since the old church was deteriorating, becoming unsafe due to needed construction, and had become too small for the needs of worship. In 1853, the church had 1,036 inhabitants, but could only house 250 inside for worship. The old church had been around since the 17th century and had been authorized for construction by Marquise de Pont-Calleck. Services were conducted by the parish of Nizon. It had been given the status of a parish in 1805.

The new church was announced to begin construction in 1874 by mayor Satre. The church was built at Place de l’Eglise according to plans by diocesan architect Joseph Bigot, between 1874 and 1875, by contractor Louis Bergé and by Jean-Louis Le Naour for the bell tower. The narrowness of the land acquired by the municipality for construction guided the building plan leading to the creation of a false transept.

While the new church was being built, services were temporarily held in a carpentry workshop and an adjoining courtyard (the Brunou sawmill on the Xavier Grall promenade). A fig tree housed one of the bells during this time.

It was consecrated on April 30, 1878.

In 1885, the new Stations of the Cross were erected.

In 1888, the choir and the vault were painted.

It used to have three bells named La Joséphine of 1807, La Joseph-Marie-Thaïs Élisabeth, and La Joseph Alain Marie of 1841. In 1897, they were replaced by three bells named Christine Emmanuel of 308 kg, Mathilde Alain of 213 kg, and Anastasie-Baptiste of 151 kg. These names were inspired by their respected godparents.

=== The Medals of the Tanguy Abbots ===
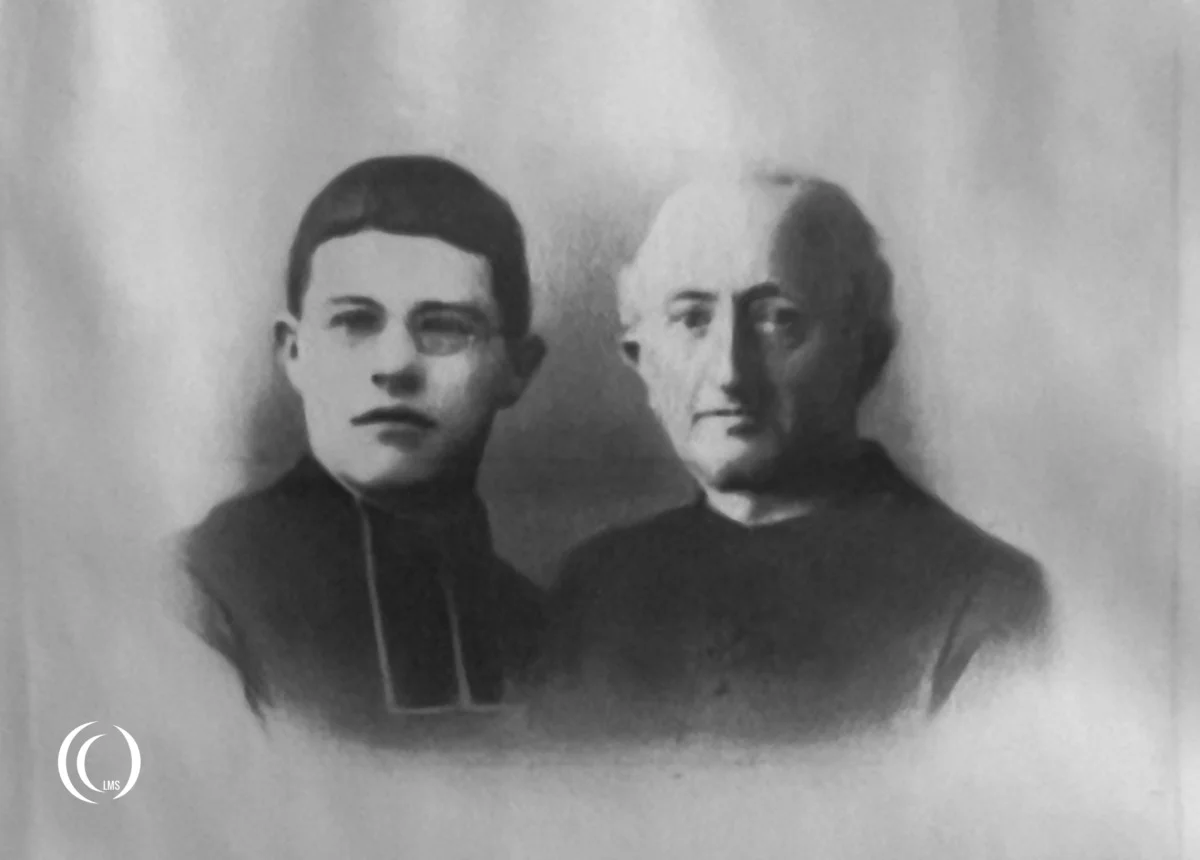
Abbots Francis and Joseph Tanguy

The church holds the two War Crosses and a Legion of Honor that were dedicated posthumously to Joseph Tanguy and Francis Tanguy (referred to as the Tanguy Abbots), a priest and vicar from Pont-Aven that worked at the Church of Pont-Aven. Though the two share a surname, they are not related. During World War II, as the Nazis began to invade France in May and June of 1940, lots of refugees arrived to Pont-Aven and the two clergymen took them in. The two clergymen actively defied the Nazis by helping people escape compulsory labor service and would preach against the Nazi invaders in Sunday sermons. They sheltered two American airmen who were downed during an air battle over Bannalec and had landed in Logan at Le Trévoux on December 31st, 1943. When the Nazis learned of this, both clergymen were arrested by the Gestapo on January 3rd, 1944 and taken to the Saint-Charles prison in Quimper where they were questioned about their participation in the French Resistance network. They were held there until April of 1944 and then transferred to Auschwitz. Ending up in the Buchenwald concentration camp, Joseph Tanguy died of mistreatment, illness, and exhaustion in May 1944. Francis Tanguy was then moved to KZ Flossenbürg in June where he would stay until dying of starvation and exhaustion in September 1994. The text below their names in the case that holds their two War Crosses and their Legion of Honor reads: "We fear nothing; we are ready for anything. The vicar and I have offered our lives for the salvation of France and your parishioners. April 1941." A monument in their memory is located in the Pont-Aven cemetery and is known as the "Abbés Tanguy". A stained glass window is also dedicated to them in the church.

== Description ==
- Main structure and implementation: granite, stone, plaster, rubble, concrete
- Roof: slate
- Plan: Latin cross
- Nave and floor: three sections
- Type and nature of the cover: cover paneling
- External elevation: elevation span
- Type of roofing: roof with long expanses; polygonal steeple in masonry

Descriptive comment: Latin cross with three aisles. Sacristy to the north at the fifth bay. South porch in alignment with the third bay. Western gate in arch inscribed in a front building topped by an open bell tower chamber, cushioned by a hexagonal steeple. Structural work in the rubble coated, except the western elevation and window bays and quoins, stone. Two lateral chapels, one to the north, and one to the south, at the seventh bay, forming a false transept. The nave has seven bays covered with paneling painted blue tie-in. Arched vaults directly into the chamfered square pillars. The floor is covered with slabs of granite.

The design is said to be "modern neo-gothic".

The church was restored in 2003 and 2004 and a new rooster was added at the top because the old one had been riddled with bullet holes and rifle impacts. The restoration also included the roof, the stonework of the facade and the bell tower, and the interior paintings.

== Art ==
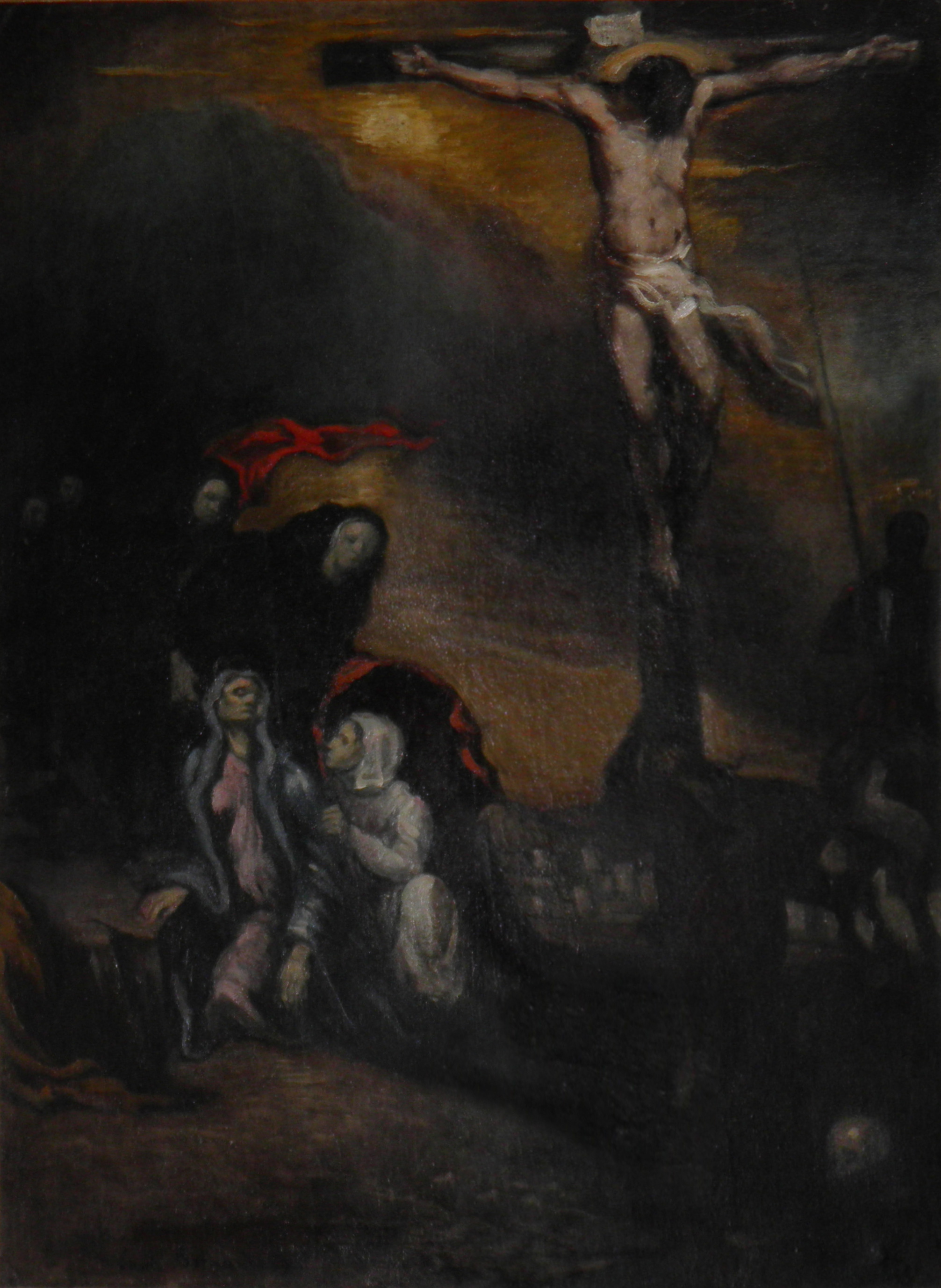
Émile Bernard, Crucifixion—1896

=== Paintings ===
There are three paintings in the church by Émile Bernard, a French Post-Impressionist painter and writer.

The paintings are:

- Crucifixion, 1896
- Mise au tombeau, vers 1900
- Portement de croix, 1905

There is another crucifixion piece that is a work from André Even, a local 20th century painter, that is dedicated, "To my native parish".

Another painting is from Father Alain Bouler, another native artist.

=== Stained glass windows ===
The stained glass windows were created by Job Guével and depict many scenes of Saints and Jesus Christ.

Some scenes depicted include:

- The cult of Saint Mathurin
- A Breton Pilgrim at the Tomb of Saint Mathurin
- Saint Guénolé presenting Saint Guénaël to his companions
- Saint John the Baptist pouring water over the head of Jesus Christ in the Jordan River
- The life of Saint Joseph
- The death of Saint Joseph

There is also a stained glass window that pays homage to the Abbots Tanguy (Joseph and Francis Tanguy), a priest and vicar from Pont-Aven who were deported and died in concentration camps during World War II.
