= Historical Society of Montgomery County, Pennsylvania =

The Historical Society of Montgomery County is a cultural institution located at 1654 DeKalb Street in Norristown, Pennsylvania. It was founded in 1881, with the mission of preserving local history. The Society purchased the former Norristown Borough Hall in 1896, and stored its papers in the building’s fireproof vault. This remained the Society’s home until the 1950s.

The Society then constructed the Colonial Revival fireproof building that continues to be its home. An addition was added in 2002.

The Society’s collections include family genealogies, deeds, tax records, maps, census records, photographs, scrapbooks, newspapers and more. Other holdings include paintings, furniture, inventions, scientific instruments, and textiles.

The Society also maintains the Montgomery Cemetery, in West Norriton Township, Pennsylvania.

The Society’s regular hours are Mondays through Thursdays, and the first Saturday of each month.

== Art Collection ==
The Society's art collection includes Thomas Hovenden's final major work, the unfinished The Founders of a State (c.1895). It also features two portraits by his wife, Helen Corson Hovenden: Portrait of Dr. William Corson and Portrait of Dr. Louis W. Read.

Montgomery Cemetery, West Norriton Township
