= Helen Corson Hovenden =

American painter (1847–1935)

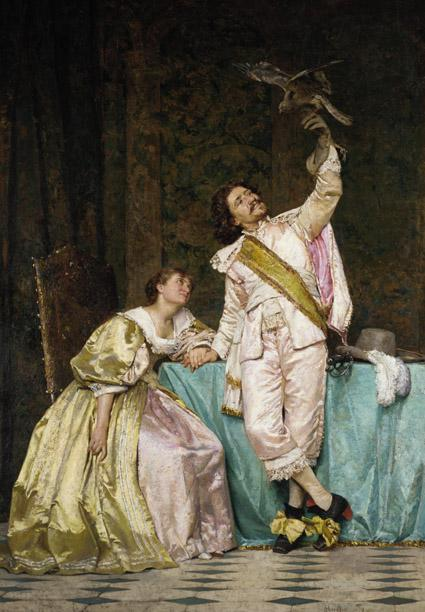
- Thomas Hovenden, The Favorite Falcon (1879), Pennsylvania Academy of the Fine Arts. A self-portrait by Hovenden with his future bride, Helen Corson.
- Born: Helen Corson; September 15, 1847; Plymouth Meeting, Pennsylvania
- Died: October 6, 1935 (aged 88); Plymouth Meeting, Pennsylvania
- Education: Philadelphia School of Design for Women, Académie Julian, Paris
- Known for: Painting, illustration
- Spouse: Thomas Hovenden
- Children: 2

Helen Corson Hovenden (1847–1935) was a Philadelphia-area painter known for her portraits and domestic scenes, sometimes of children with pets, and for watercolors of birds and flowers.

Both her parents had been abolitionists, and risked heavy fines and federal prison to assist persons escaping enslavement.

Corson married the Irish-born genre painter Thomas Hovenden. Their son, Thomas Hovenden Jr., became a civil engineer. Their daughter, Martha Maulsby Hovenden, became a sculptor.

The Woodmere Art Museum in Chestnut Hill, Philadelphia holds a number of Helen Corson Hovenden's works, along with works by her husband and daughter.

== Family, education and marriage ==
Helen Corson was born in Plymouth Meeting, Whitemarsh Township, Pennsylvania, the daughter of Quakers George and Martha Maulsby Corson. (Note: George Corson and his brother Walter founded G. & W. H. Corson Company – Lime Merchants in 1843. "[A]s of 1983 it was reputed to be the oldest continuously operated lime business in the U.S.”) She attended the Plymouth Friends School, and the Philadelphia School of Design for Women.

Corson moved to France in 1875 to study painting at the Académie Julian in Paris. (Note: Helen Corson traveled with Philadelphia artist Milne Ramsey and his wife and child, and lodged with them in Paris.) She was invited to exhibit at the Paris Salons of 1876, 1879 and 1880.

In 1879, Corson met Irish painter Thomas Hovenden at the summer artist colony at Pont-Aven, France. Hovenden painted her as the lady and himself as the cavalier in The Favorite Falcon (1879). She later modeled for both Elaine and Queen Guinivere in his major painting Elaine (1880-82), which Hovenden began in France and finished in a studio in New York City. The couple returned to the United States in late 1880, and were married at the Plymouth Friends Meetinghouse on June 9, 1881.

"He [Thomas Hovenden] would often speak of his wife's talent being superior to his own. However that may be, it is certain that she was both an inspiration and a help to him in the execution of his great work."

=== Abolitionist upbringing ===
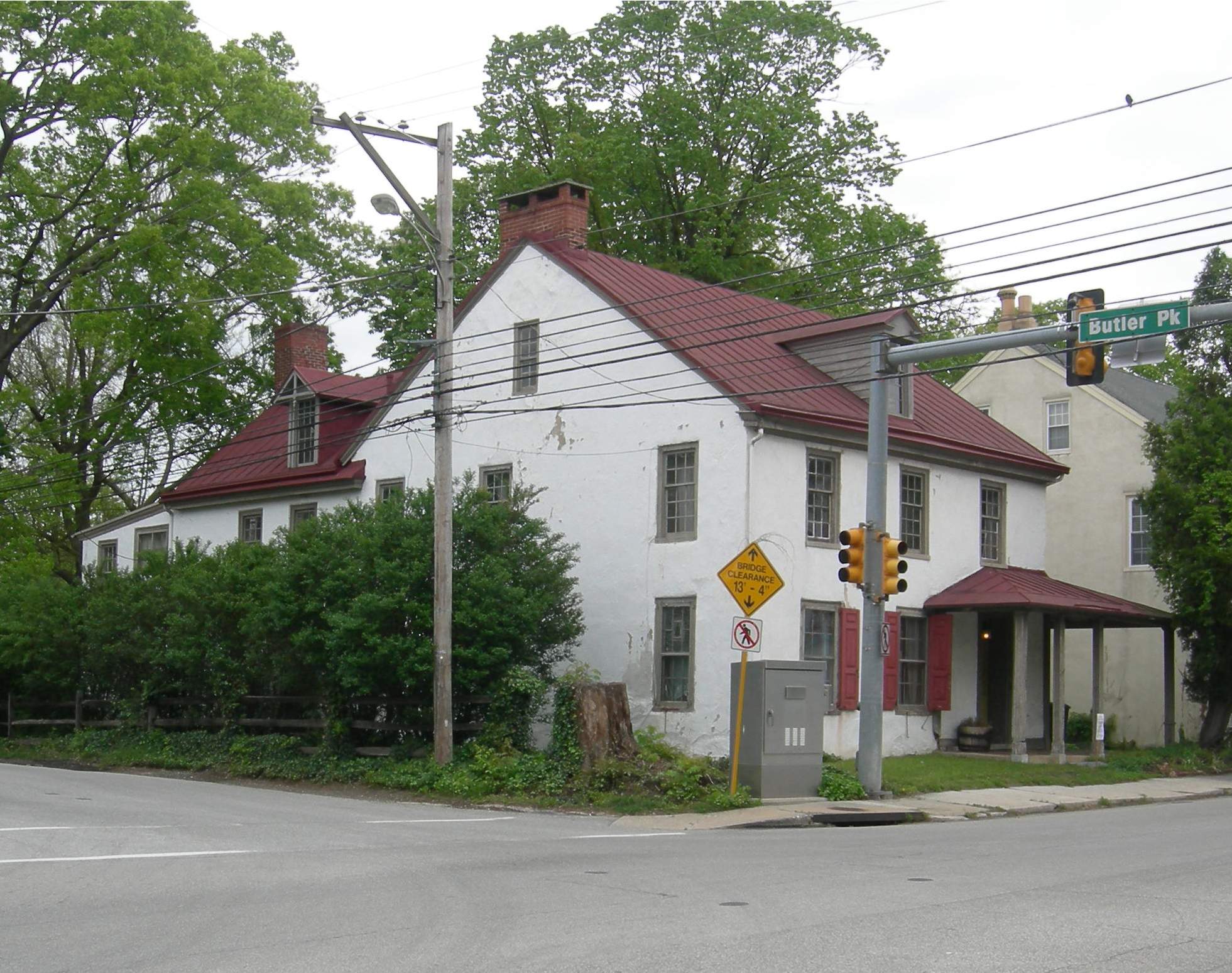
Maulsby-Corson-Hovenden House (built 1795), in 2016

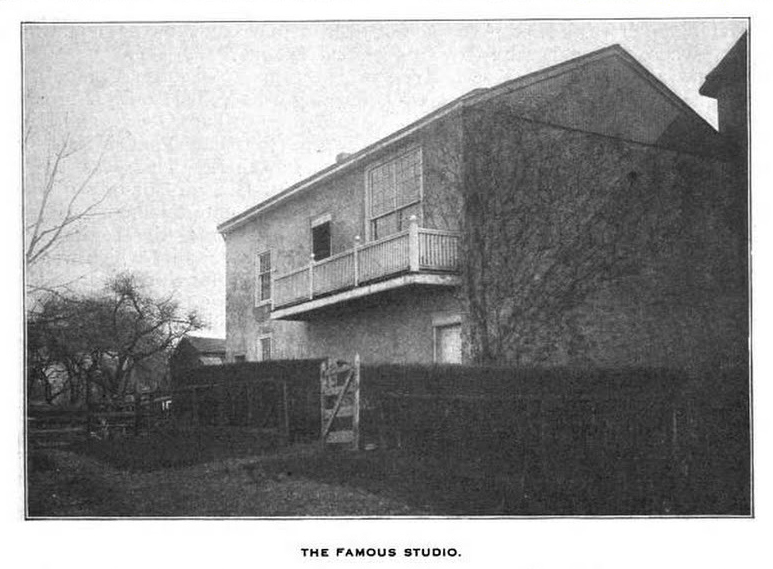
In 1856, George Corson built Abolition Hall over his coach-house/ stable to host anti-slavery lectures and meetings. Painter Thomas Hovenden made Abolition Hall his studio in 1881. 1909 photograph.

The newlyweds settled into her late parents' house, across Germantown Pike from the meetinghouse. Helen Corson's maternal grandfather, Samuel Maulsby, built the house in 1795. He and her paternal grandfather, Joseph Corson, had been lifelong friends and ardent abolitionists. In 1831, both were founding members of the Plymouth Meeting Anti-Slavery Society.

The Maulsby-Corson House was an important stop on the Underground Railroad for close to thirty years, until her father's death in 1860. (Note: The greater burden of the work [of sheltering runaways] was borne by George and his wife, Martha Maulsby Corson. Their residence in the old Maulsby home, right in front of the Friends' Plymouth Meeting-House, was so prominent a place, known by everybody for miles around, made it easy for slaves to find the place, when sent by those from a distance to "George Corson's at Plymouth Meeting." He it was who forwarded fugitives to Mahlon Linton, at Newtown, or to William H. Johnson, at Buckingham, or to Richard Moore, at Quakertown, Bucks county, time after time, during the whole period of the great struggle from 1830 to 1850.) Waking up each morning as children, Helen Corson and her five siblings never knew whether there would be newly arrived guests around the breakfast table.

The Fugitive Slave Act of 1850 increased the penalties for giving assistance to someone escaping enslavement to six months in federal prison and a $1,000 fine. George and Martha Maulsby Corson were involved in hiding Jane Johnson, whose 1855 escape to freedom exposed a loophole in the federal law. Following a nationally-publicized victory in Philadelphia federal court, (Note: The case concerned John H. Wheeler, a North Carolina slaveholder and the U.S. Ambassador to Nicaragua, who voluntarily brought Jane Johnson and her two sons into the free state of Pennsylvania. Federal Court in Philadelphia found that Johnson and her sons were not fugitives across state lines under the 1850 Fugitive Slave Act; therefore, federal law did not apply. Pennsylvania law empowered Johnson to petition for legal manumission for herself and her sons (which she did), and also barred Wheeler from removing them from the state until their case had been adjudicated (as it was in their favor).) Johnson was hidden at the Corson house in Plymouth Meeting to prevent pro-slavery activists from abducting her and returning her to bondage. (Note: "The following night, in a close carriage, she [Johnson] was brought to the house of George Corson, at Plymouth Meeting, where for a few days in privacy, she received the kind ministrations of Martha Maulsby Corson, wife of George, and one of the earliest and most devoted of the abolitionists of the region.")

Plymouth Friends had allowed the Anti-Slavery Society to use its meetinghouse for lectures for twenty-five years, but that permission was denied in 1856. (Note: “Permission was revoked after the burning of an area church that had hosted abolitionist speakers.” The Plymouth Friends Meeting House suffered a major fire in 1858, but it could not be determined if the fire had been intentionally set.) George Corson responded by building a second-floor lecture hall over his coach-house/stable — Abolition Hall. (Note: "George Corson determined to build a hall, over which he could have control. He made quite a large one and furnished it well with seats, warmed and lighted at his own expense. And now we can see how convenient it was for the lecturers to make his house their temporary home. As time wore on more and more neighbors and friends were attracted to the meetings to hear the eloquent and earnest men and women who pictured the atrocities of slavery.")

Twenty-five years later, Thomas Hovenden turned Abolition Hall into his studio, and found inspiration in the righteous anti-slavery arguments that had been made there. (Note: "When Thomas Hovenden, the historic painter, was commissioned to paint a picture of [the radical abolitionist] John Brown, he came to the house of George Corson, and the hall at this station of the 'Underground Railroad' became most appropriately the studio in which Mr. Hovenden painted his great picture, John Brown Being Led to Execution.")

== Selected works ==
External videos
- “Looking at Paintings with Bill Valerio: Thomas Hovenden & Helen Corson Hovenden”, John Thornton

- Breton Courtyard (1878, oil on canvas), private collection, Plymouth Meeting, Pennsylvania
- Still Life [Wine Carafe, Wineglass & 3 Apples] (1879, medium), unlocated. Exhibited at the 1879 Paris Salon.
- Still Life (1880, medium), unlocated. Exhibited at the 1880 Paris Salon.
- In Front of the Stable (1880, oil on canvas), unlocated. Exhibited at the 1880 Paris Salon.
- Portrait of Dr. William Corson (1880, oil on canvas), Historical Society of Montgomery County, Norristown, Pennsylvania. Dr. Corson was Helen Corson Hovenden's uncle, her father's brother. (Note: Helen Corson, Portrait of Dr. William Corson, Norristown. "Oil painting by the exhibitor, niece of Dr. Corson; painted in December, 1880.")
- Portrait of Dr. Louis W. Read (year, oil on canvas), Historical Society of Montgomery County, Norristown, Pennsylvania. Dr. Read was Helen Corson Hovenden's uncle-by-marriage, husband of her father's sister Sarah.
- Uncle Ned and His Pupil (1881, oil on canvas), Wells Fargo Bank N.A. Headquarters, Sioux Falls, South Dakota. An elderly Black man teaching a boy (grandson?) to play the banjo.
- Mother and Daughter (c.1882, medium), unlocated. Exhibited at the National Academy of Design, October 1882
- I Take My Pen in Hand (1883, watercolor), Dawson Gallery, Annapolis, Maryland
- Lillie and Mamie (1884, medium), unlocated. Exhibited at the National Academy of Design, October 1884
- Short Days and Long Lessons (1885, ink on paper), Woodmere Art Museum, Chestnut Hill, Philadelphia
- The Little Housekeeper (c.1885, medium), unlocated. Exhibited at the National Academy of Design, October 1885
- Playing School (c.1886, medium), unlocated. Exhibited at the National Academy of Design, October 1886
- Martha Hovenden and Her Dog Rob (c.1887, oil on canvas), Woodmere Art Museum, Chestnut Hill, Philadelphia, Pennsylvania
- The Concert (c.1890, oil on canvas), Woodmere Art Museum, Chestnut Hill, Philadelphia, Pennsylvania. Six-year-old Martha Hovenden playing a harmonica to a dog.
- In the Gallery (1901, oil on canvas), private collection, Virginia Beach, Virginia. A boy (Thomas Jr.?) looking at paintings.
- A Misanthrope (year, medium), unlocated. Exhibited at PAFA's 100th Anniversary Exhibition, January–March 1905.
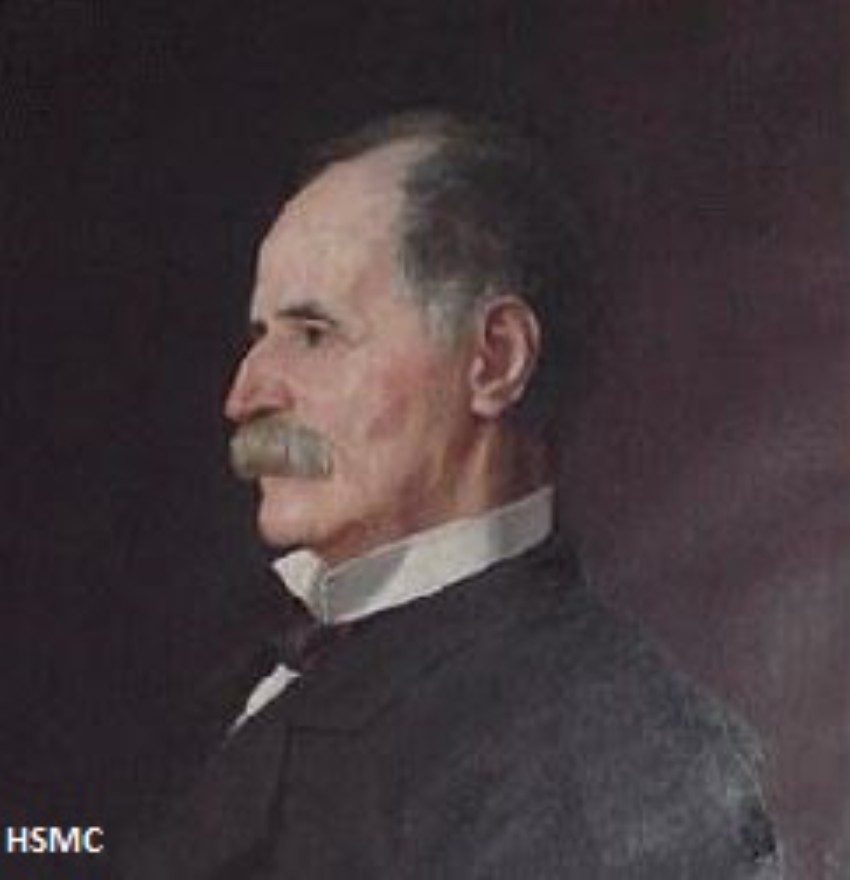
Helen Corson, Portrait of Dr. William Corson (1880, oil on canvas), Historical Society of Montgomery County, Pennsylvania

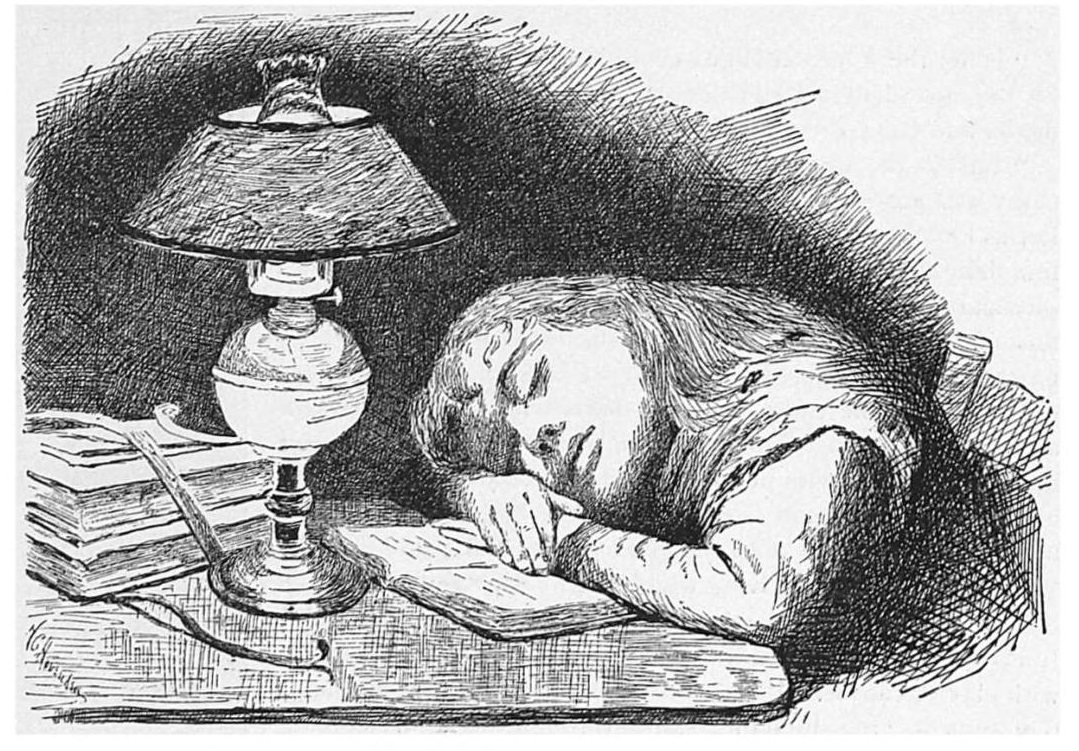
Helen Corson Hovenden, Short Days and Long Lessons (1885, ink on paper) Woodmere Art Museum, Philadelphia

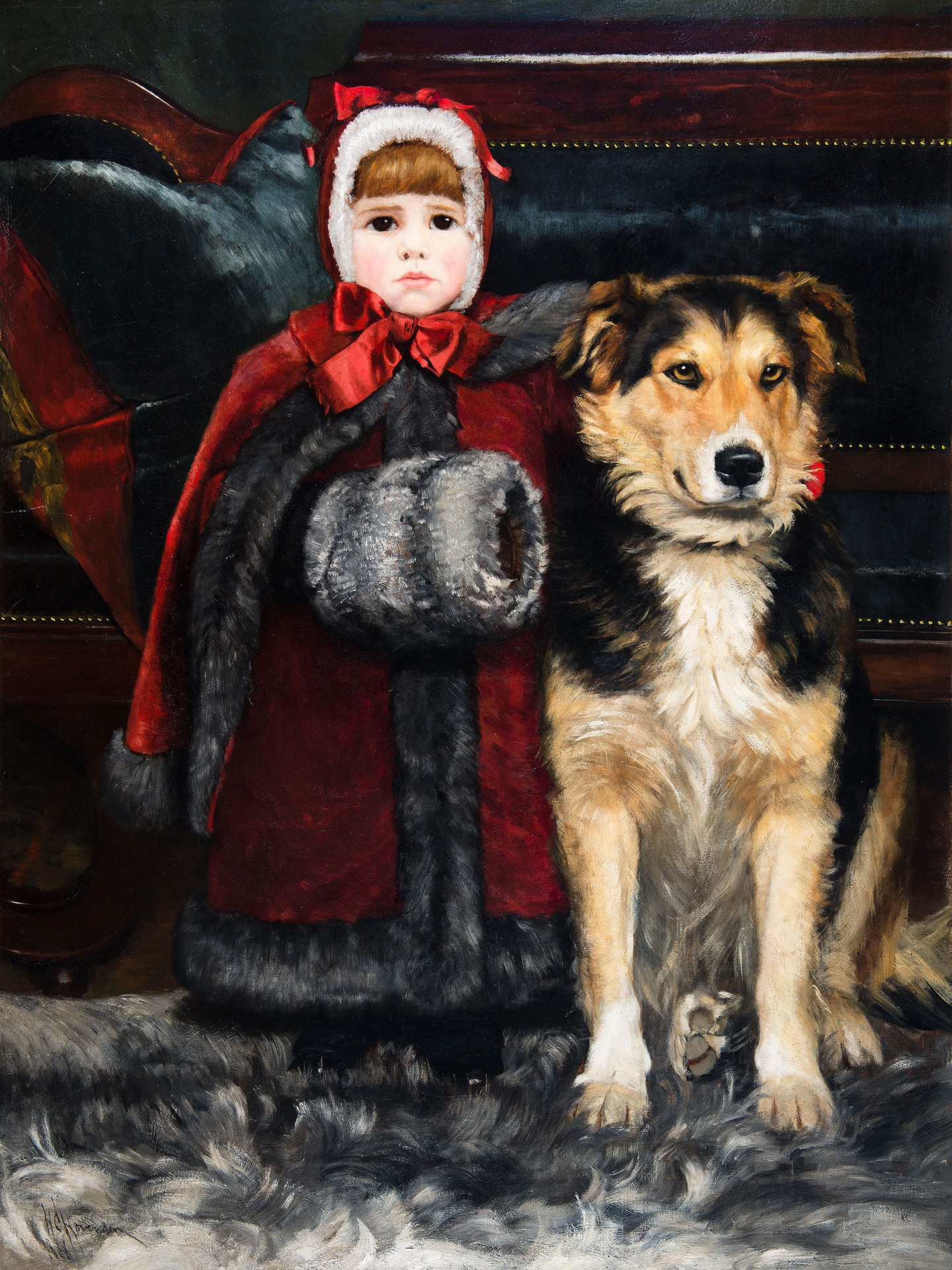
Helen Corson Hovenden, Martha Hovenden and Her Dog Rob (c.1887, oil on canvas), Woodmere Art Museum, Philadelphia

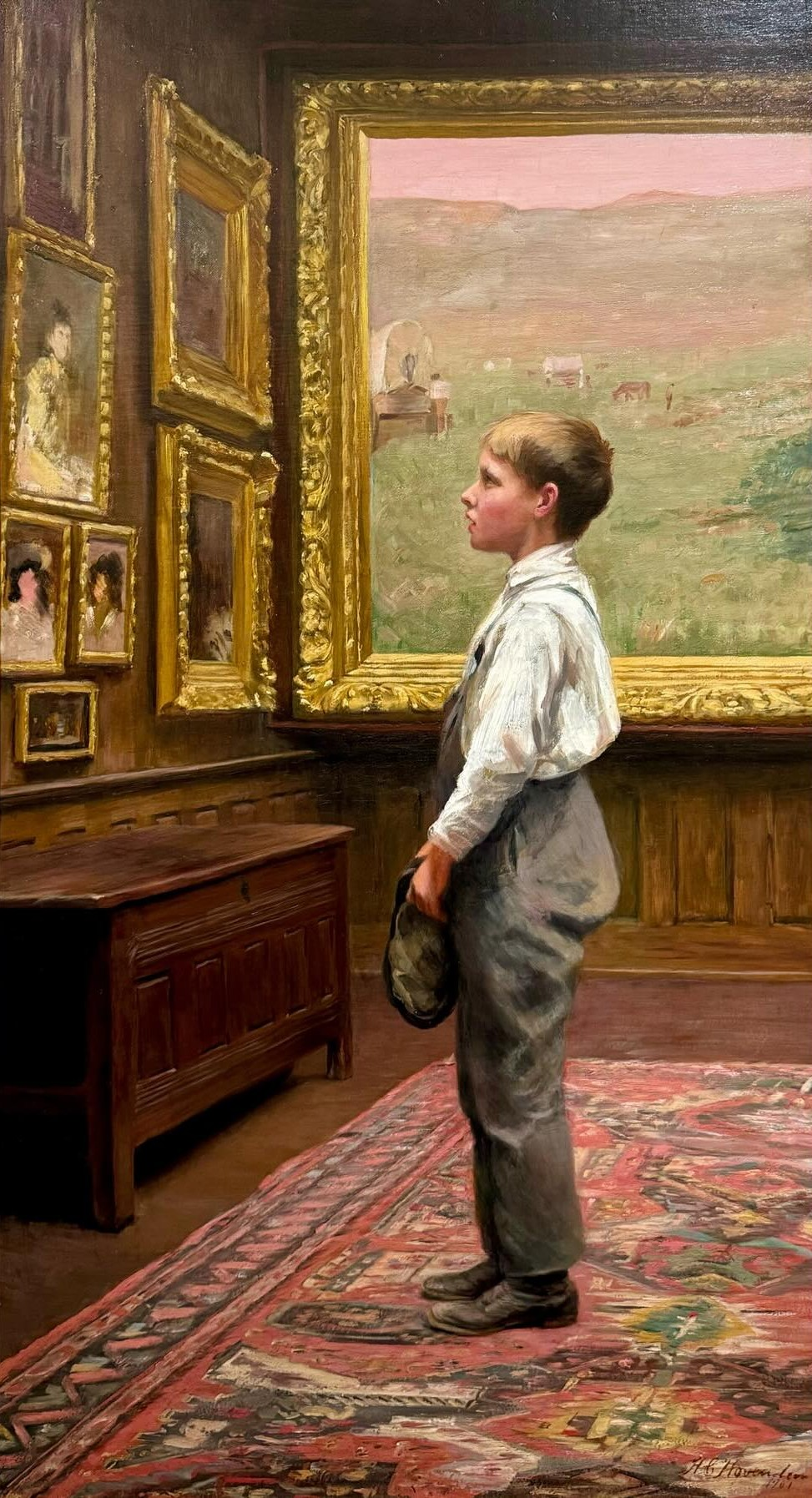
Helen Corson Hovenden, In the Gallery (c.1901, watercolor), private collection

=== Exhibitions ===
Helen Corson Hovenden exhibited at the Paris Salons of 1876, 1879 and 1880.

She exhibited a portrait of a mother and child at the National Academy of Design in 1884, and domestic scenes of children in 1885 and 1886.

She exhibited sporadically at the annual exhibitions of the Pennsylvania Academy of the Fine Arts. The nine works she showed between 1885 and 1905 were portraits or domestic scenes, some of which included animals.

She exhibited with the Society of Washington Artists in 1899 and 1900.

Daughter Martha Maulsby Hovenden later served as a director of the Conshohocken Art League. In 1966, the League hosted the first posthumous joint exhibition of works by Thomas and Helen Corson Hovenden.

== Widowhood ==
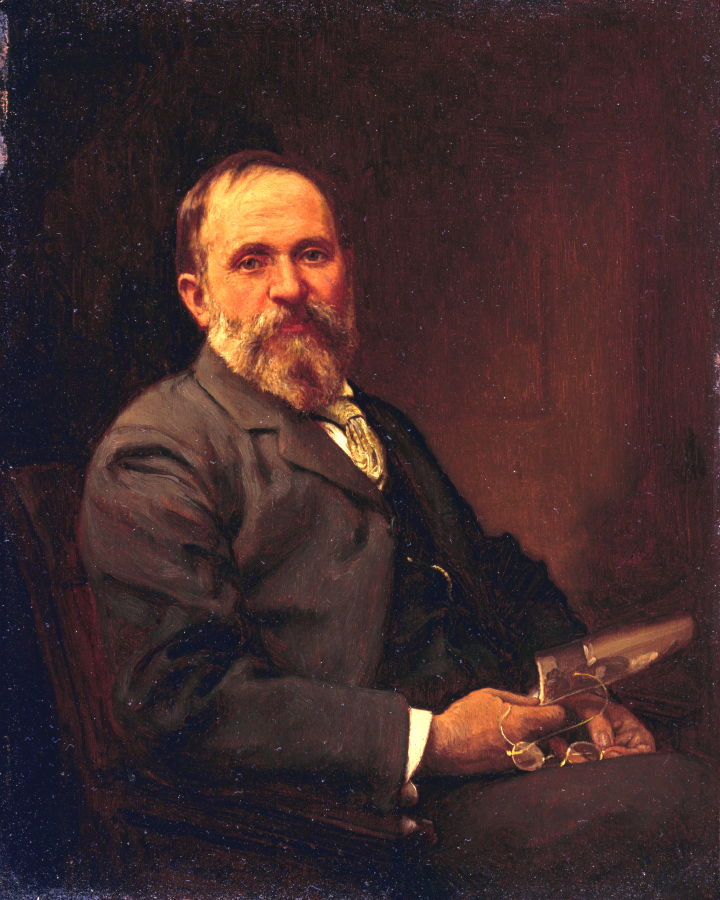
Posthumous Portrait of Thomas Hovenden (1896, from a photograph) by William Magrath, de Young Museum, San Francisco

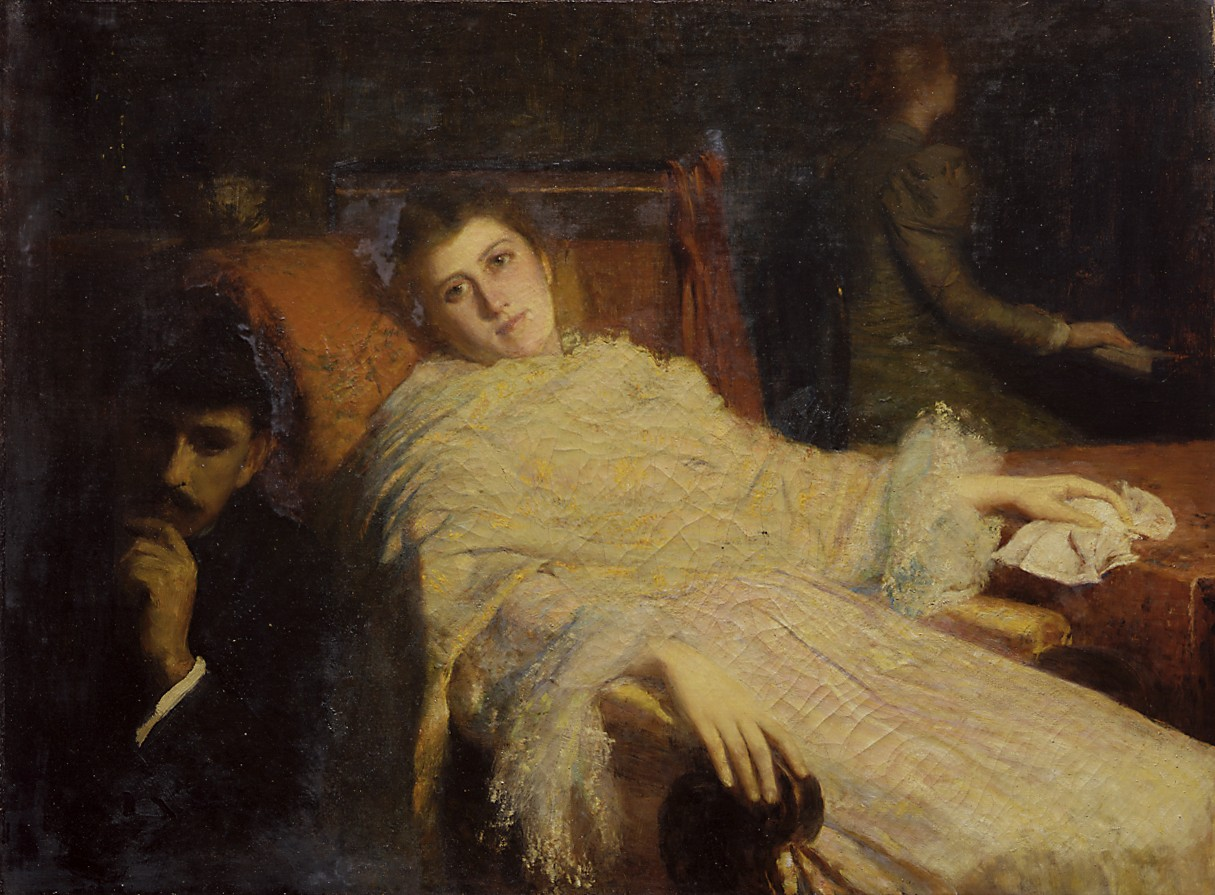
Jerusalem the Golden (1892-94) by Thomas Hovenden, Metropolitan Museum of Art

Fifteen years after her husband's death, Helen Corson Hovenden wrote a biographical sketch of him: "Thomas Hovenden lost his life on an unguarded grade crossing of the Pennsylvania Railroad near his home, August 14, 1895, in an attempt to save the life of a little girl [nine-year-old Bessie Pifer] who was crossing in front of an approaching engine. Both were killed." The accident occurred about two miles south of the Hovendens' house, at Spring Mill station, along the Schuylkill River.

Rev. William Henry Furness gave the eulogy at Thomas Hovenden's funeral, and the pall bearers were painter Thomas Eakins, sculptor Samuel Murray, and four Corson relatives.

Helen Corson Hovenden channeled her grief into advocacy, leading a successful public letter-writing campaign by Quaker women to pressure the Pennsylvania Railroad into elevating the tracks of its Trenton Cutoff, separating high-speed PRR trains from the grade level tracks of streetcars.

She donated her husband's last completed painting, Jerusalem the Golden (1892-94), to the Metropolitan Museum of Art, in his memory. It features a sickly young woman, a worried husband, and the woman's sister playing "Jerusalem the Golden" in the background. The hymn "was meant to provide solace and comfort to the faithful in the face of death by offering salvation and promising peace in the afterlife." (Note: Jerusalem the Golden 1) Jerusalem the golden, With milk and honey blest, Beneath thy contemplation Sink heart and voice oppressed: I know not, O I know not, What joys await us there, What radiance of glory, What bliss beyond compare! 4) O sweet and blessed country, The home of God’s elect! O sweet and blessed country That eager hearts expect! Jesus, in mercy bring us To that dear land of rest, Who art, with God the Father And Spirit, ever blest!)

Helen Corson Hovenden and her two children moved to Washington, D.C., staying for several years with her unmarried sister Ida. Both children attended the Sidwell Friends School. The family moved back to Plymouth Meeting following Ida Corson's April 1900 marriage to William Augustin DeCaindry.

Helen Corson Hovenden's 1910 biographical sketch of her late husband was written for the Historical Society of Montgomery County, Pennsylvania. In that same volume, Rev. Ernst P. Pfatteicher gave a detailed account of Thomas Hovenden's funeral, and wrote about the continued popularity of his paintings; Harrison S. Morris, Director of the Pennsylvania Academy of the Fine Arts, 1882-1905, wrote about his friendship with Thomas Hovenden, and their years of working together.

== Children ==
Thomas Hovenden Jr. (1882–1915) graduated from Sidwell Friends School in Washington, D.C. with the class of 1899. He earned bachelor's (1903) and master's (1904) degrees in civil engineering from the University of Pennsylvania. He worked as an instructor at the university for a year, and was certified as a civil engineer in 1905. He joined the Philadelphia firm of W. W. Lindsay & Co., Inc., engineering consultants and contractors, and rose to general superintendent of the company. Over a decade, he designed and built blast furnaces, manufacturing plants and highway bridges in the United States and Cuba. Thomas Hovenden Jr. died of typhoid fever at age 33, September 18, 1915. (Note: Thomas Hovenden, 2d, a civil engineer and son of the late Thomas Hovenden, who painted “Breaking Home Ties,” died September 18, 1915, at his home in Plymouth Meeting, Pa. For five weeks he had suffered from typhoid fever. He was 33 years old and unmarried.)

Martha Maulsby Hovenden (1884–1941) studied under sculptor Charles Grafly at the Pennsylvania Academy of the Fine Arts in Philadelphia, where her late father had taught painting. Subsequently, she studied under sculptor Hermon Atkins MacNeil at the Art Students League of New York. She had a moderately successful career as a sculptor, never married, and lived with her mother in Plymouth Meeting until Helen Corson Hovenden's death in 1935. She continued to occupy the Maulsy/Corson/Hovenden House until her own death, on February 27, 1941. Martha Maulsby Hovenden's most significant commission was for the two large limestone bas-relief panels inside the Washington Memorial Chapel at Valley Forge, Pennsylvania.
