= Thomas Hovenden =

Irish artist and teacher (1840–1895)

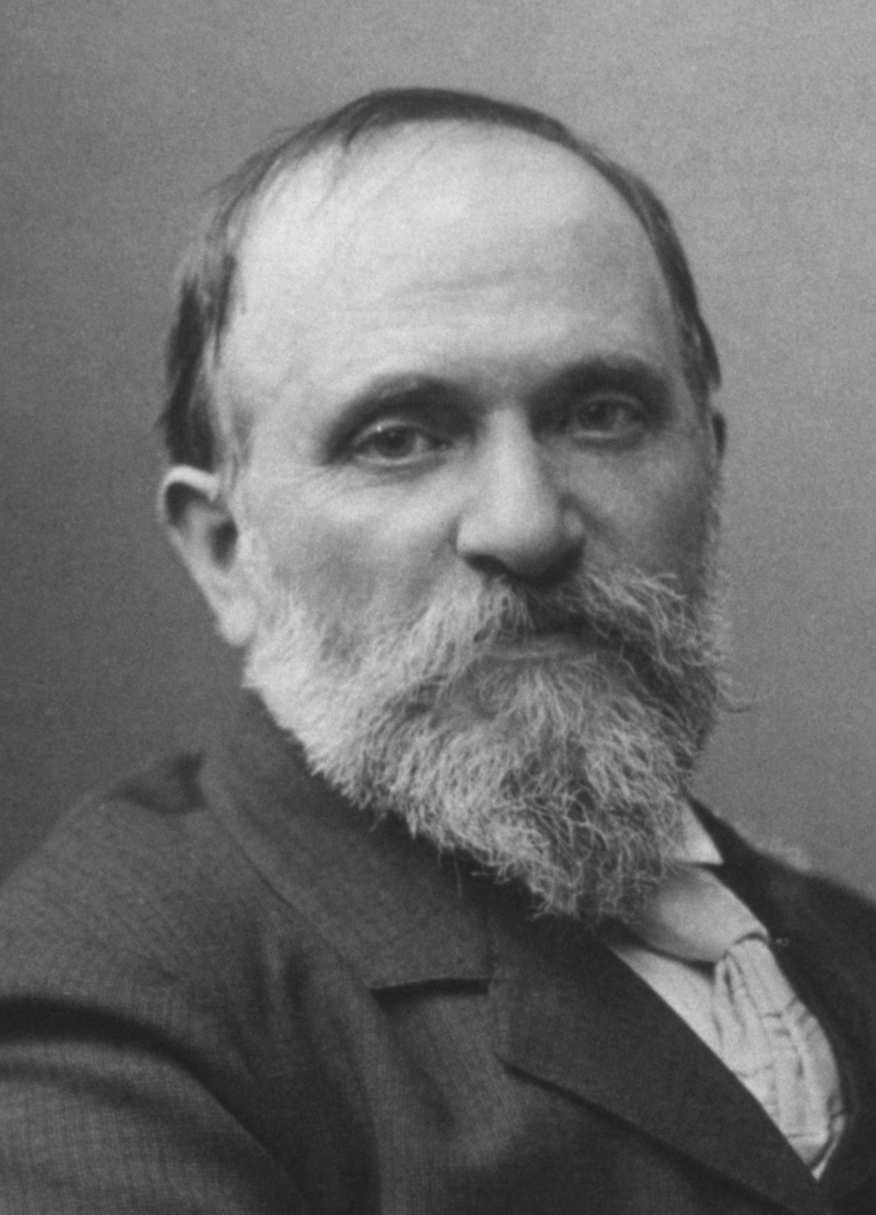
- Thomas Hovenden in 1895
- Born: December 28, 1840; Dunmanway, County Cork, Ireland
- Died: August 14, 1895 (aged 54); Plymouth Meeting, Pennsylvania, United States
- Education: Cork School of Design; National Academy of Design; École des Beaux Arts under Cabanel
- Known for: Painting
- Notable work: The Last Moments of John Brown (1884); Breaking Home Ties (1890)
- Spouse: Helen Corson Hovenden

Thomas Hovenden (December 28, 1840 – August 14, 1895) was an Irish-born painter and teacher who spent most of his life in the United States. He painted historical works, domestic scenes and narrative subjects, some depicting African Americans.

== Biography ==
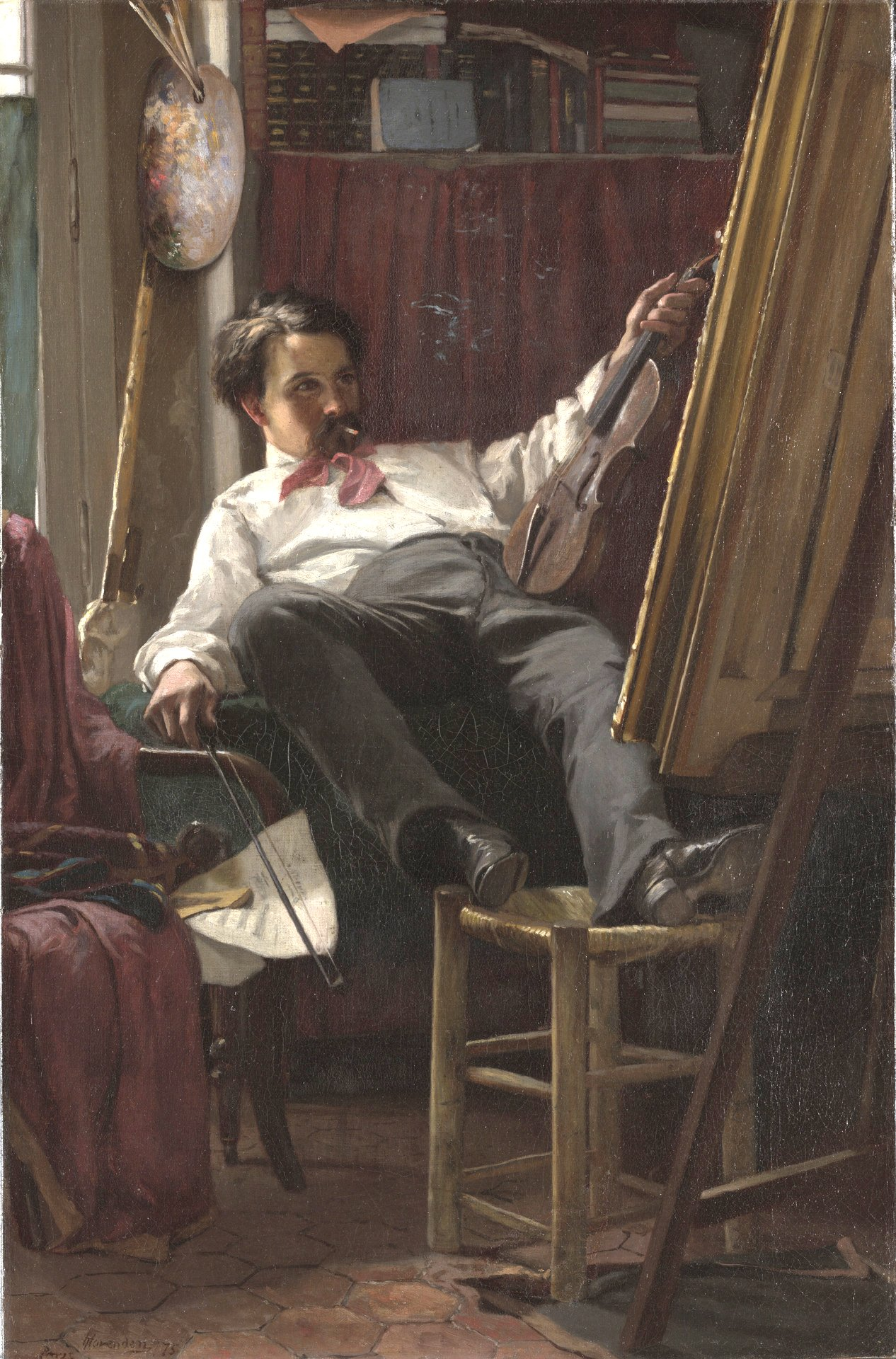
Self-Portrait of the Artist in His Studio (1875), Yale University Art Gallery.

Hovenden was born in Dunmanway, County Cork, Ireland. Both his parents died in the 1845-1852 Great Famine, and he was placed in an orphanage at the age of six. Apprenticed to a carver and gilder, he studied at the Cork School of Design.

Hovenden immigrated to the United States in 1863, and studied at the National Academy of Design in New York City. He moved to Baltimore in 1868, where he painted for several years and met businessmen and art collectors William T. Walters and John W. McCoy. With McCoy's financial sponsorship, Hovenden moved to Paris in 1874, where he studied at the École des Beaux Arts under Cabanel. He spent his summers at the American art colony at Pont-Aven in Brittany, where he painted many pictures of the peasantry.

Returning to America in 1880, Hovenden joined the Society of American Artists. He was elected an Associate member of the National Academy of Design in 1881, and was elected an Academician in 1882.

He married Helen Corson in June 1881, an artist he had met in Pont-Aven, and they settled into her late parents' homestead in Plymouth Meeting, Pennsylvania, outside of Philadelphia. She came from a family of Quakers and abolitionists, and for decades their house had been a stop on the Underground Railroad. Her father built an addition to the barn to house anti-slavery lectures and meetings, which was known as "Abolition Hall." Thomas Hovenden made Abolition Hall his studio.

Hovenden was commissioned by Robbins Battell, of Norfolk, Connecticut, to paint a historical picture of the executed abolitionist leader John Brown. Hovenden's The Last Moments of John Brown (1884), is in the collection of The Metropolitan Museum of Art in New York City. Hovenden also painted a two-thirds replica, that is in the collection of the de Young Museum in San Francisco.

Hovenden's Breaking Home Ties (1890), a picture of American family life, caused a sensation at the 1893 World's Columbian Exhibition in Chicago, Illinois. It was engraved with considerable popular success.

In 1886, he was appointed Professor of Painting and Drawing at the Pennsylvania Academy of the Fine Arts; replacing Thomas Eakins, who had violated PAFA policy by using a fully nude male model before a class that included female students. Among Hovenden's students were the sculptor Alexander Stirling Calder and the leader of the Ashcan School, Robert Henri.

Hovenden and a nine-year-old girl were killed by a railroad locomotive at an unguarded crossing near Plymouth Meeting, in August 1895. Newspaper accounts reported that his death was the result of a heroic effort to push the girl out of the path of the train. A coroner's inquest determined his death to have been an accident.

A Pennsylvania state historical marker in Plymouth Meeting interprets Abolition Hall and Hovenden. Hovenden House, Barn and Abolition Hall was added to the National Register of Historic Places in 1971. Hovenden was buried across the street in the cemetery of the Plymouth Friends Meetinghouse.

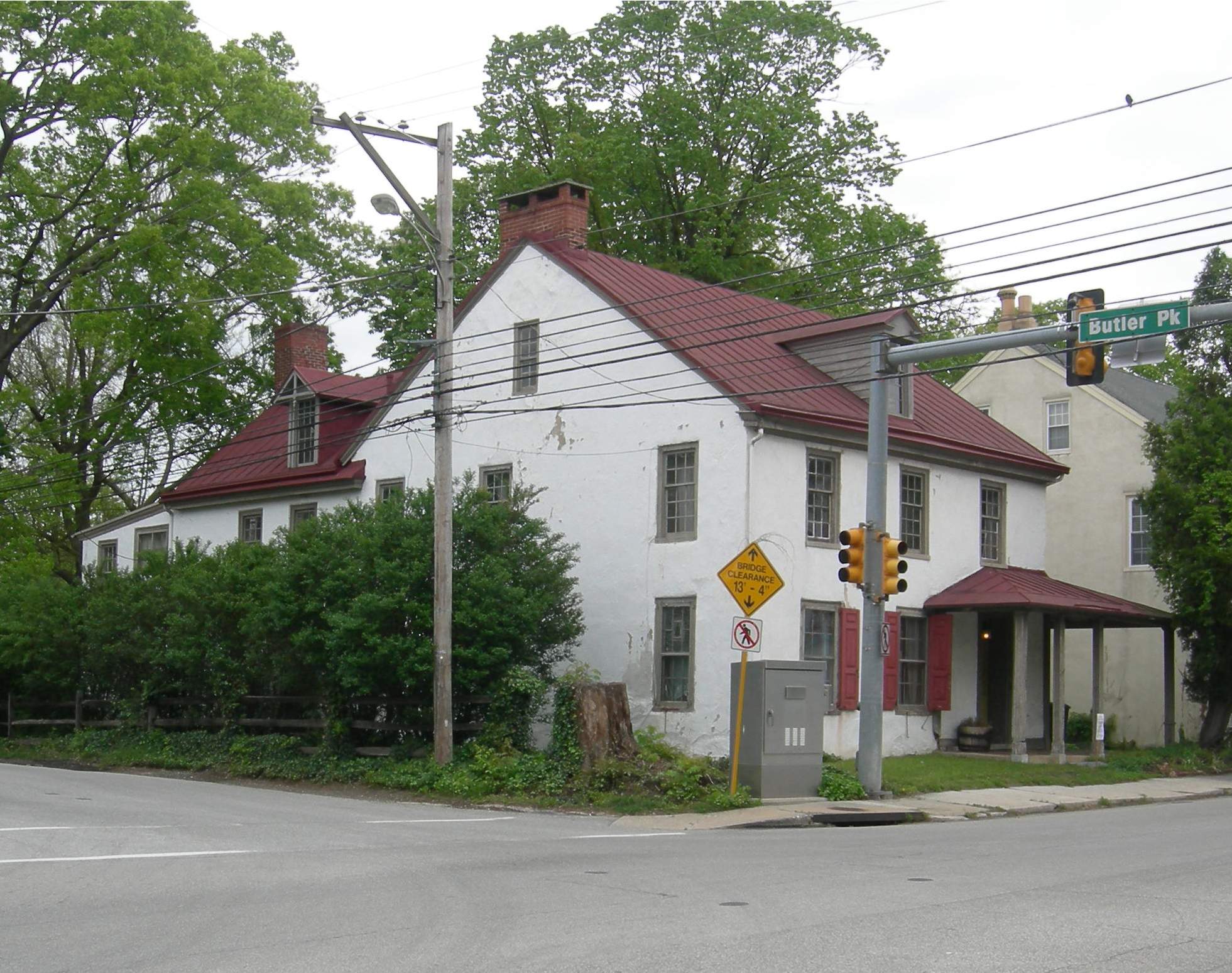
Hovenden House, Plymouth Meeting, Pennsylvania. He lived here from his marriage in 1881 to his death in 1895.

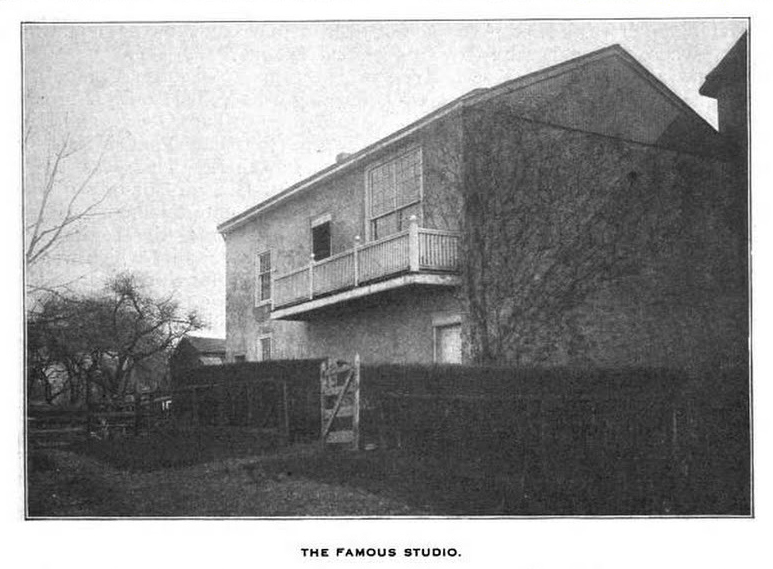
Hovenden turned Abolition Hall into his studio.

== Selected works ==
- Self-Portrait of the Artist in His Studio, 1875, Yale University Art Gallery
- Image Seller, 1876, Metropolitan Museum of Art
- News from the Conscript, 1877
- Loyalist Peasant Soldier of La Vendée, 1877
- A Breton Interior, 1793, 1878, Metropolitan Museum of Art
- The Favorite Falcon, 1879, Pennsylvania Academy of the Fine Arts, Philadelphia
- In Hoc Signo Vinces, 1880, Detroit Institute of Arts, Michigan
- Faint Heart Never Won Fair Lady, 1880, Woodmere Art Museum, Chestnut Hill, Philadelphia
- The Old Version, 1881, San Francisco Museum of Fine Art
- The Revised Version, 1881, National Academy of Design, New York City
- Sunday Morning, 1881, San Francisco Museum of Fine Art
- Chloe and Sam, 1882, Amon Carter Museum, Fort Worth, Texas
- Dem Was Good Ole Times, 1882, oil on canvas, Chrysler Museum of Art, Norfolk, Virginia
  - Dem Was Good Ole Times, 1882, watercolor, Reynolda House Museum of American Art, Winston-Salem, North Carolina
- Elaine, 1882, Westmoreland Museum of American Art, Greensburg, Pennsylvania
- The Last Moments of John Brown, 1884, oil on canvas, Metropolitan Museum of Art
  - The Last Moments of John Brown, c.1884, oil on canvas, de Young Museum, San Francisco. A 2/3-size replica.
- Taking His Ease, 1885, San Francisco Museum of Fine Art
- I Know'd It Was Ripe, 1885, Brooklyn Museum
- Their Pride, 1888, Union League Club of New York
- Breaking Home Ties, 1890, Philadelphia Museum of Art
- Where the Robins Sing (1890), Woodmere Art Museum, Chestnut Hill, Philadelphia
- Bringing Home the Bride, 1893, University of St. Thomas, St. Paul, Minnesota
- Jerusalem the Golden, 1894, Metropolitan Museum of Art
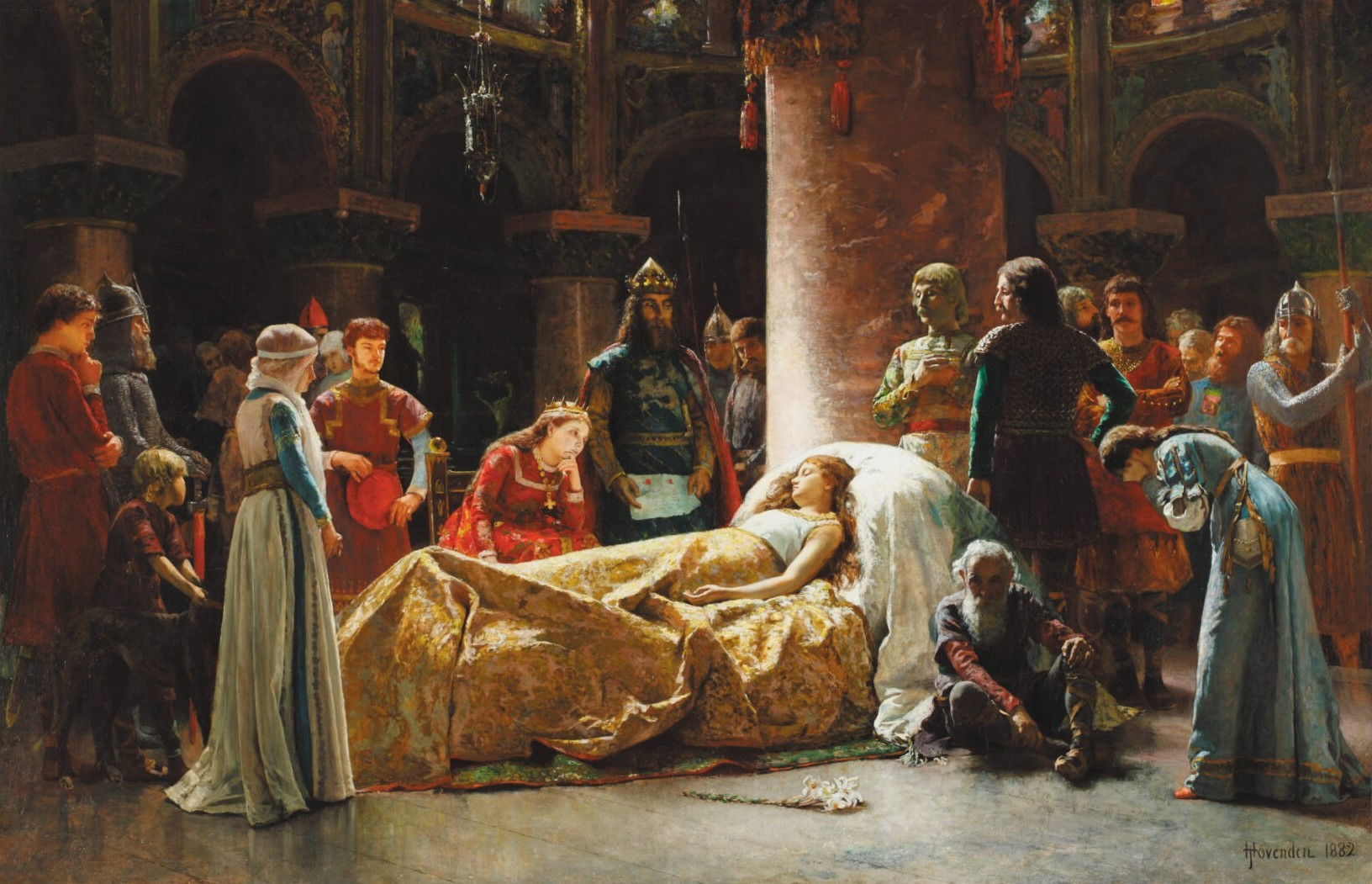
Elaine (1880-1882), Westmoreland Museum of American Art, Greensburg, Pennsylvania

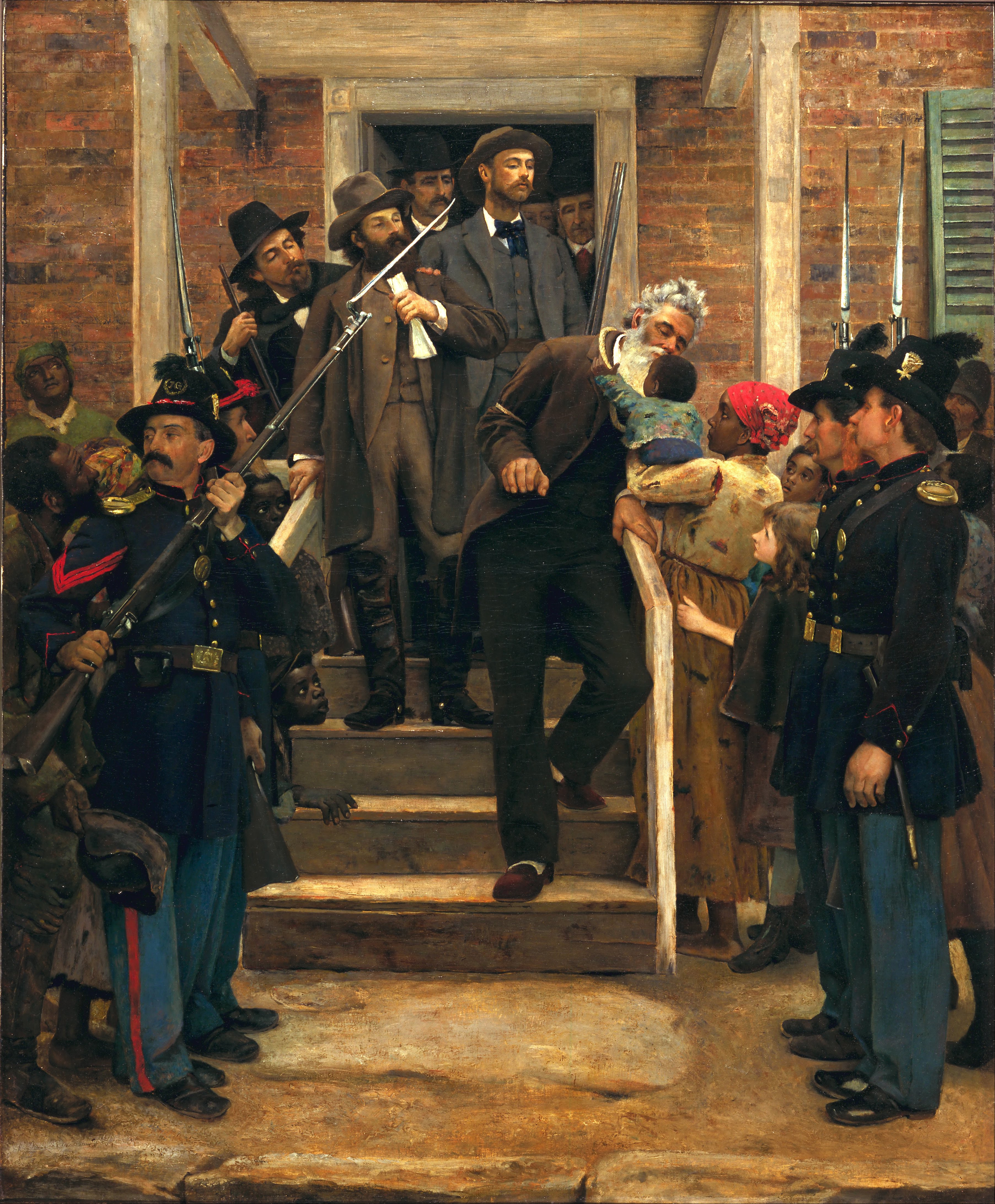
The Last Moments of John Brown (1884), Metropolitan Museum of Art

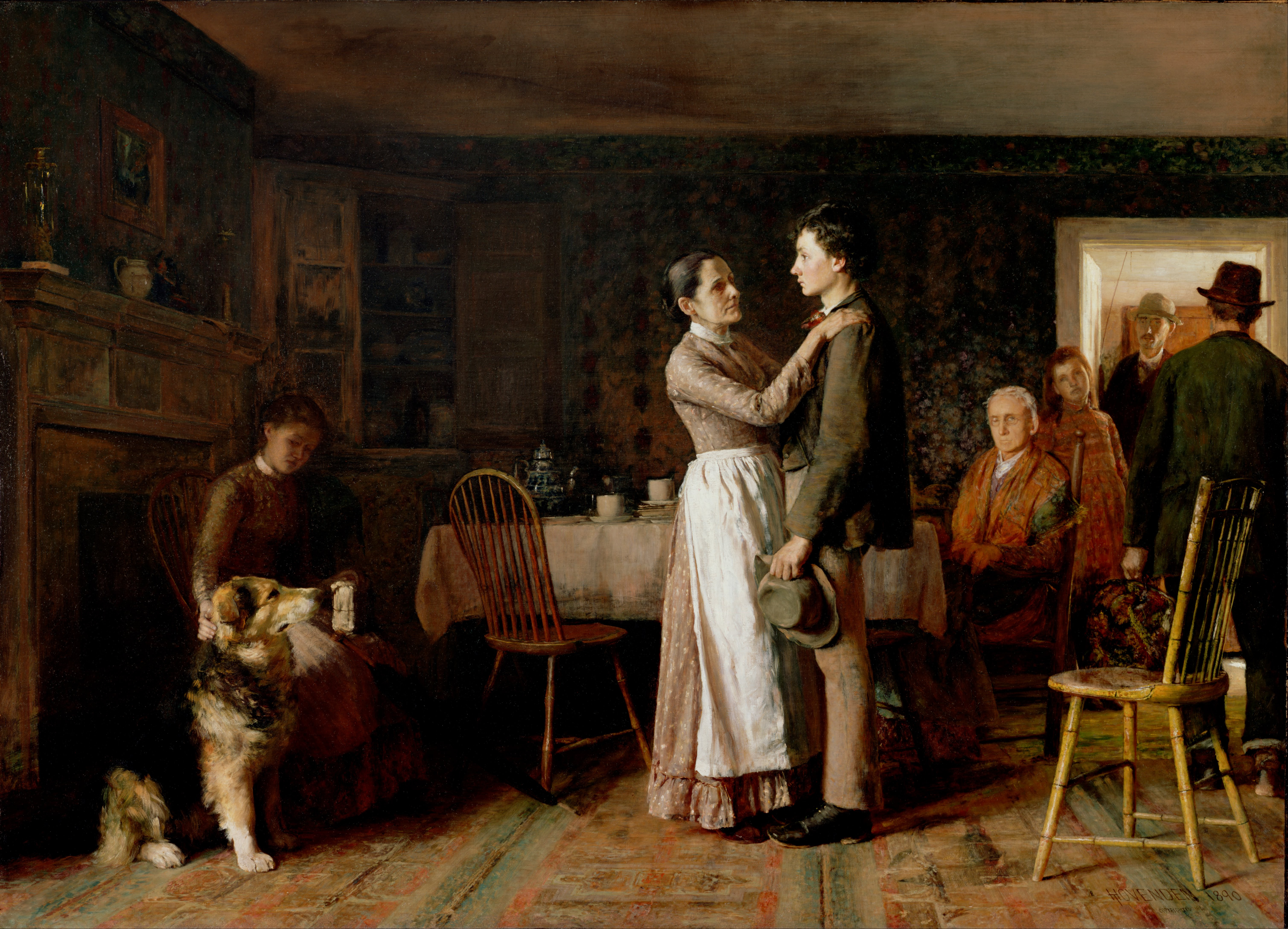
Breaking Home Ties (1890), Philadelphia Museum of Art.

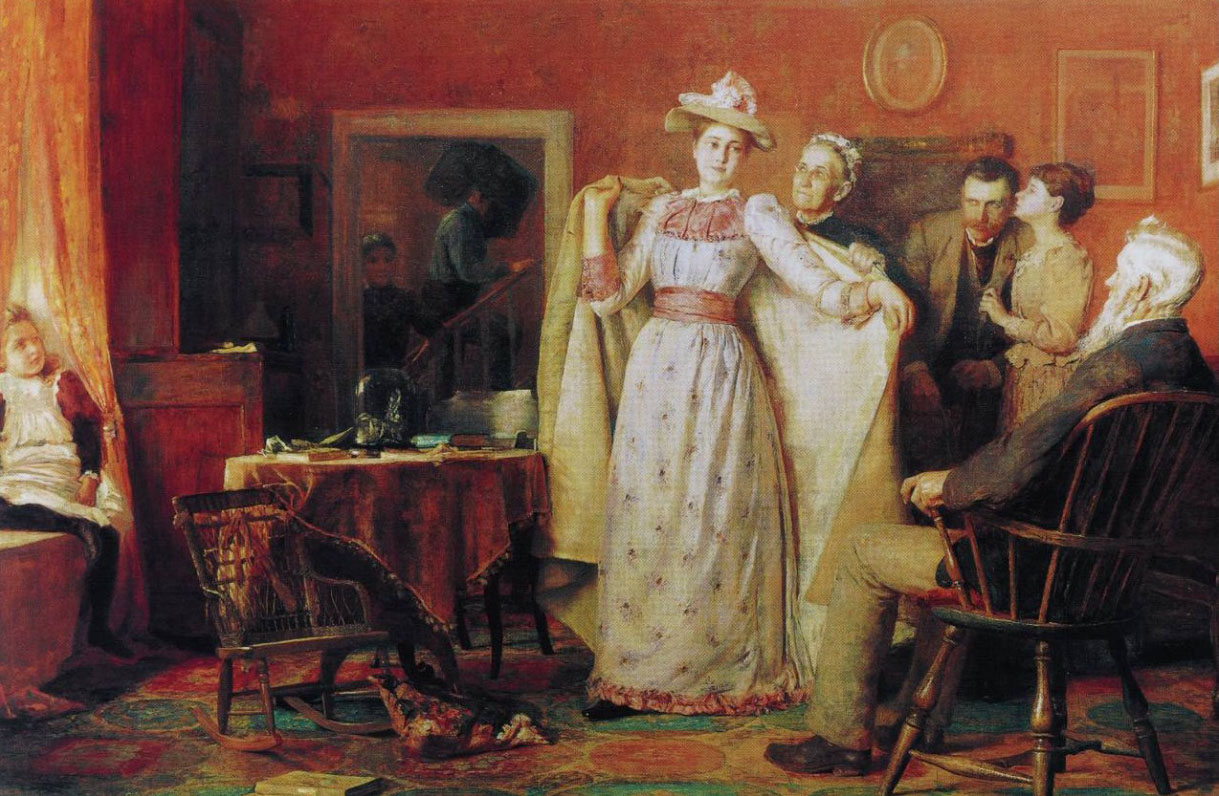
Bringing Home the Bride (1893), University of St. Thomas, St. Paul, Minnesota

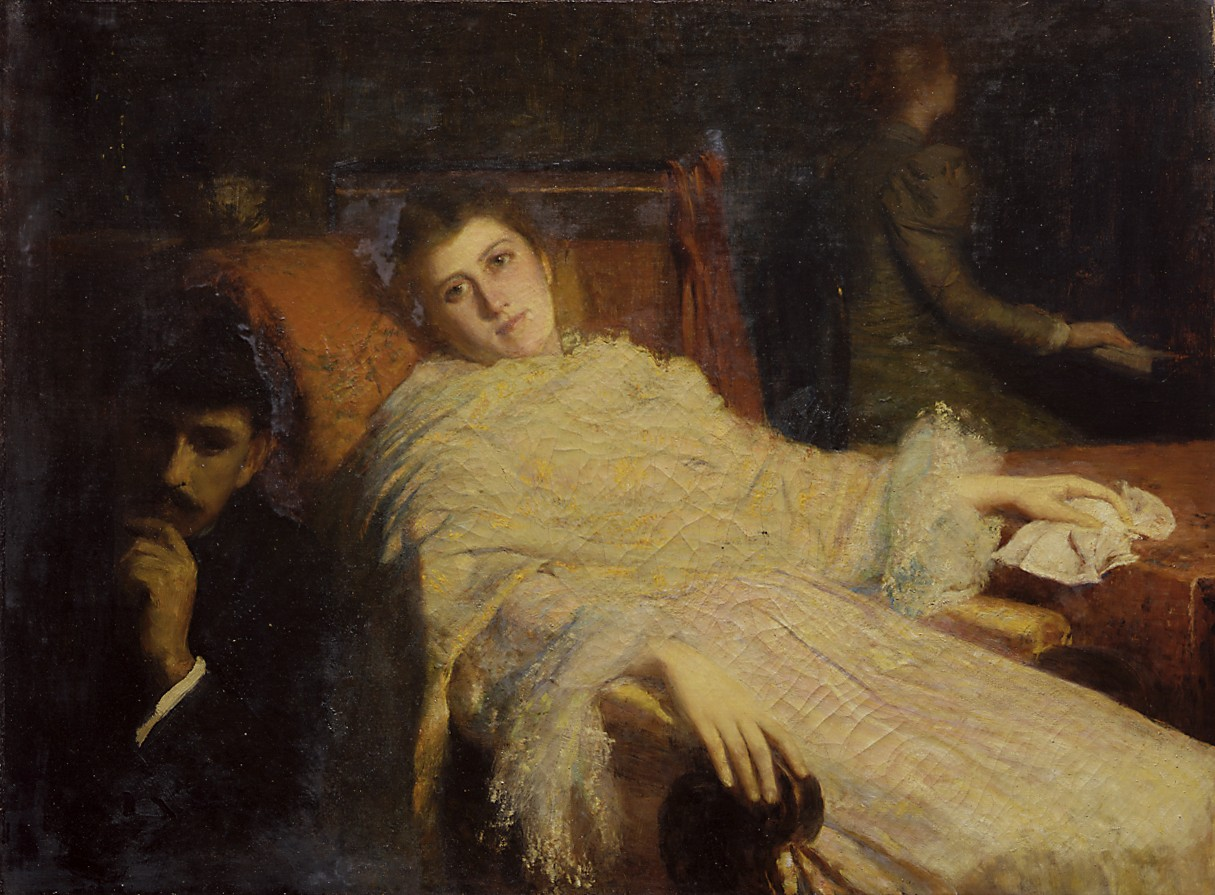
Jerusalem the Golden (1894), Metropolitan Museum of Art

== Portrayal of African Americans ==
Hovenden taught at the Pennsylvania Academy of Fine Arts. One of his students was Henry Ossawa Tanner, an African American who was possibly one of the first Black students to attend the school. Tanner would be famous for painting two images of African Americans, different for portraying them with dignity. These were The Banjo Lesson and The Thankful Poor.

Among Hovenden's works was a series of portraits of two elderly African Americans. His images were different than many made by his contemporaries, because he showed the Black couple as having a sense of dignity, rather than being caricatures. However, he has also been accused of portraying African Americans from a superior point-of-view, the images showing people content in their poverty.

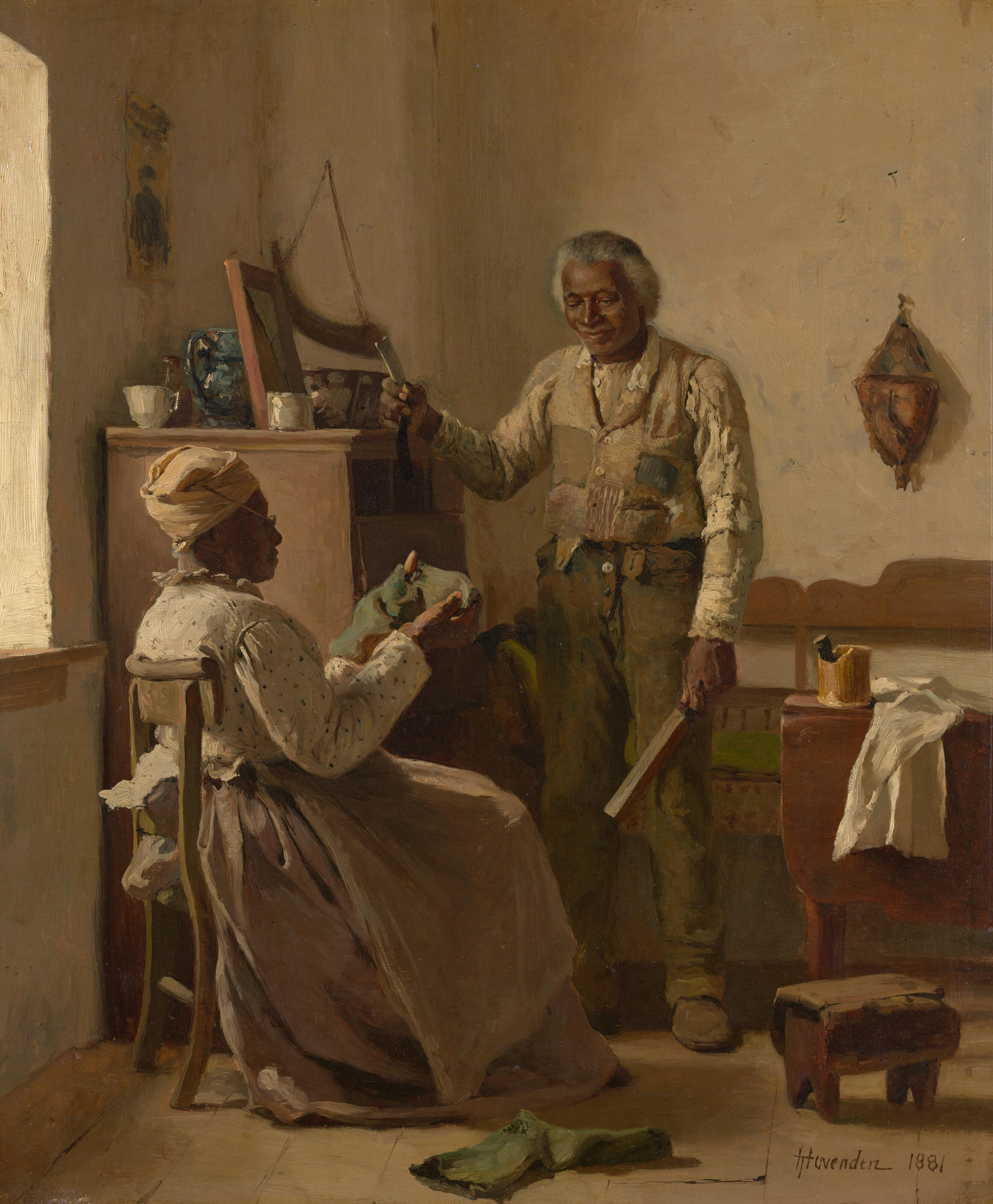
Sunday Morning (1881), de Young Museum, San Francisco

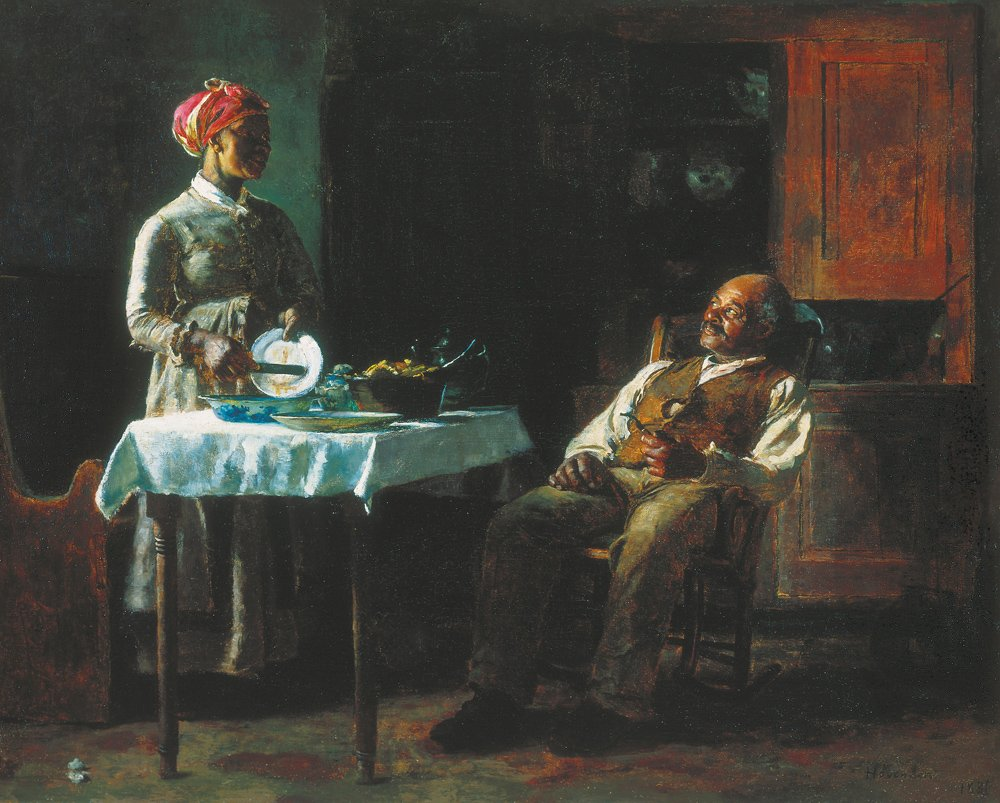
Contentment (1881), Columbus Museum, Columbus, Georgia

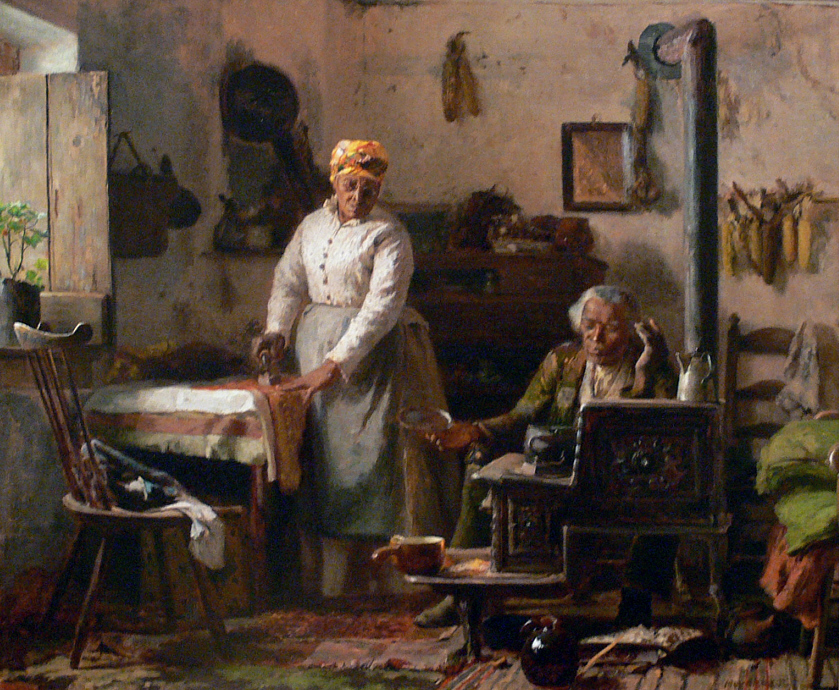
Chloe and Sam (1882), Amon Carter Museum.

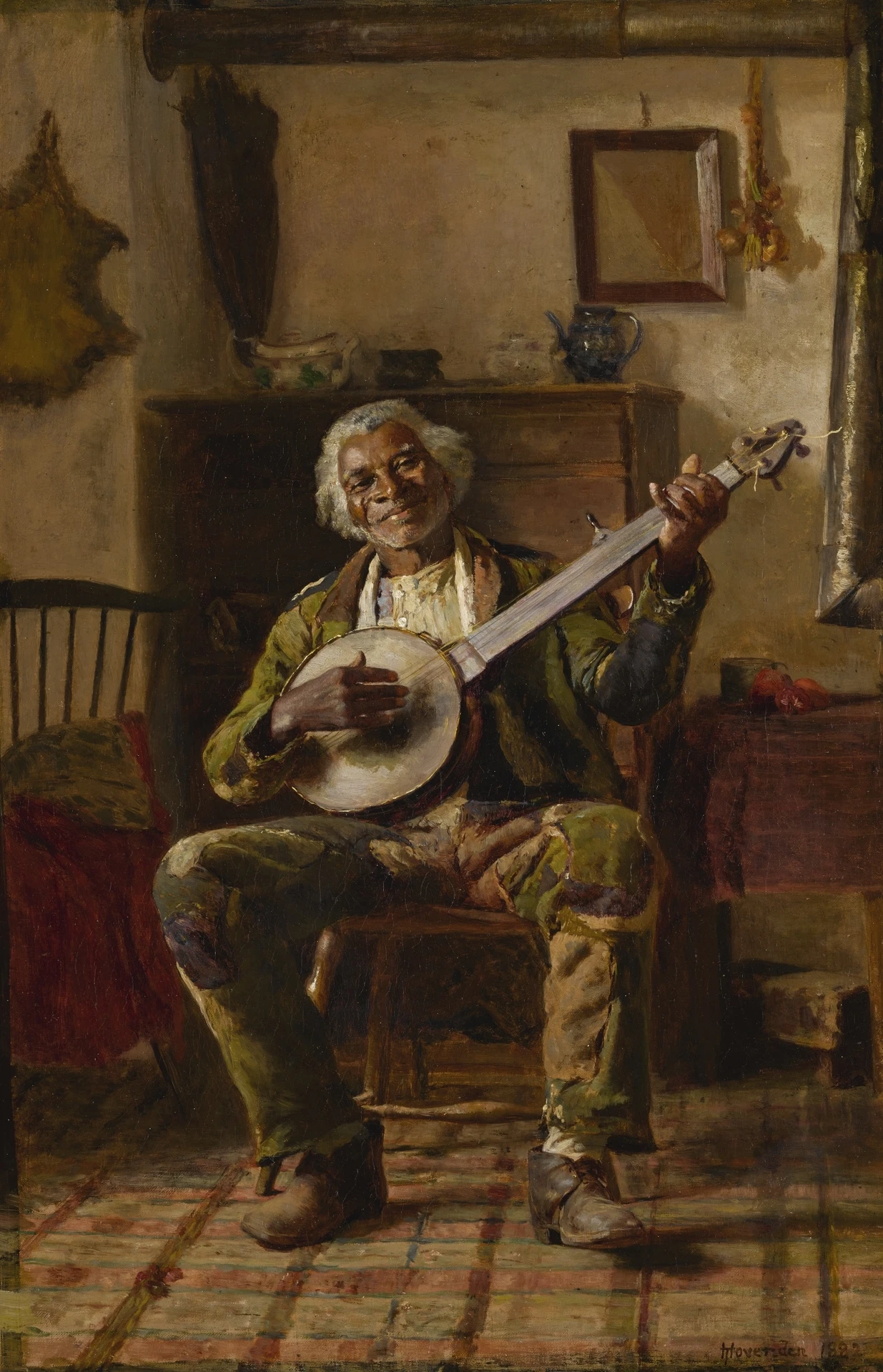
Old Man with Banjo (1882). Appears to be "Sam" from Chloe and Sam

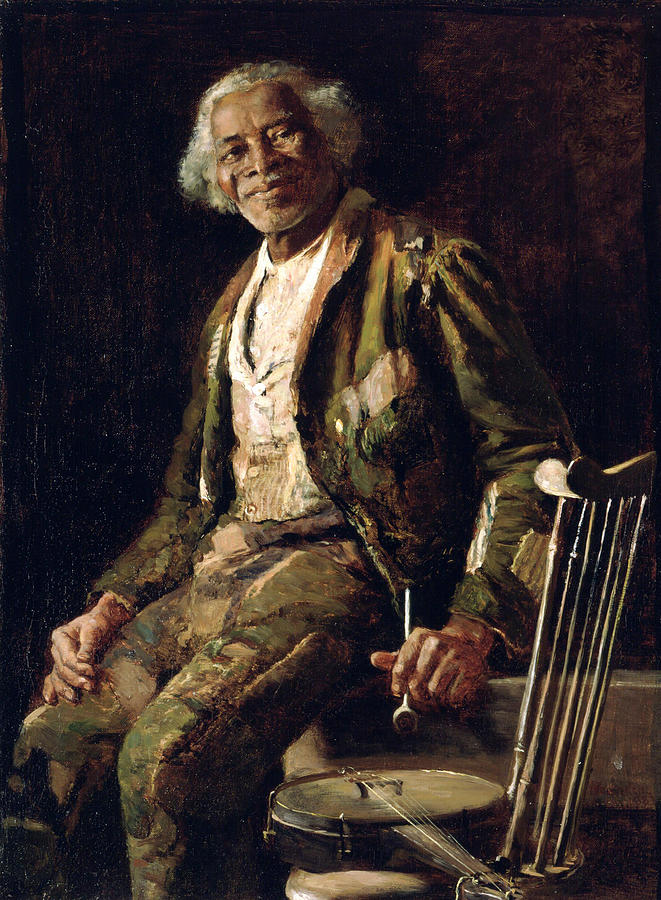
Dem Was Good Ole Times (1882), Chrysler Museum of Art

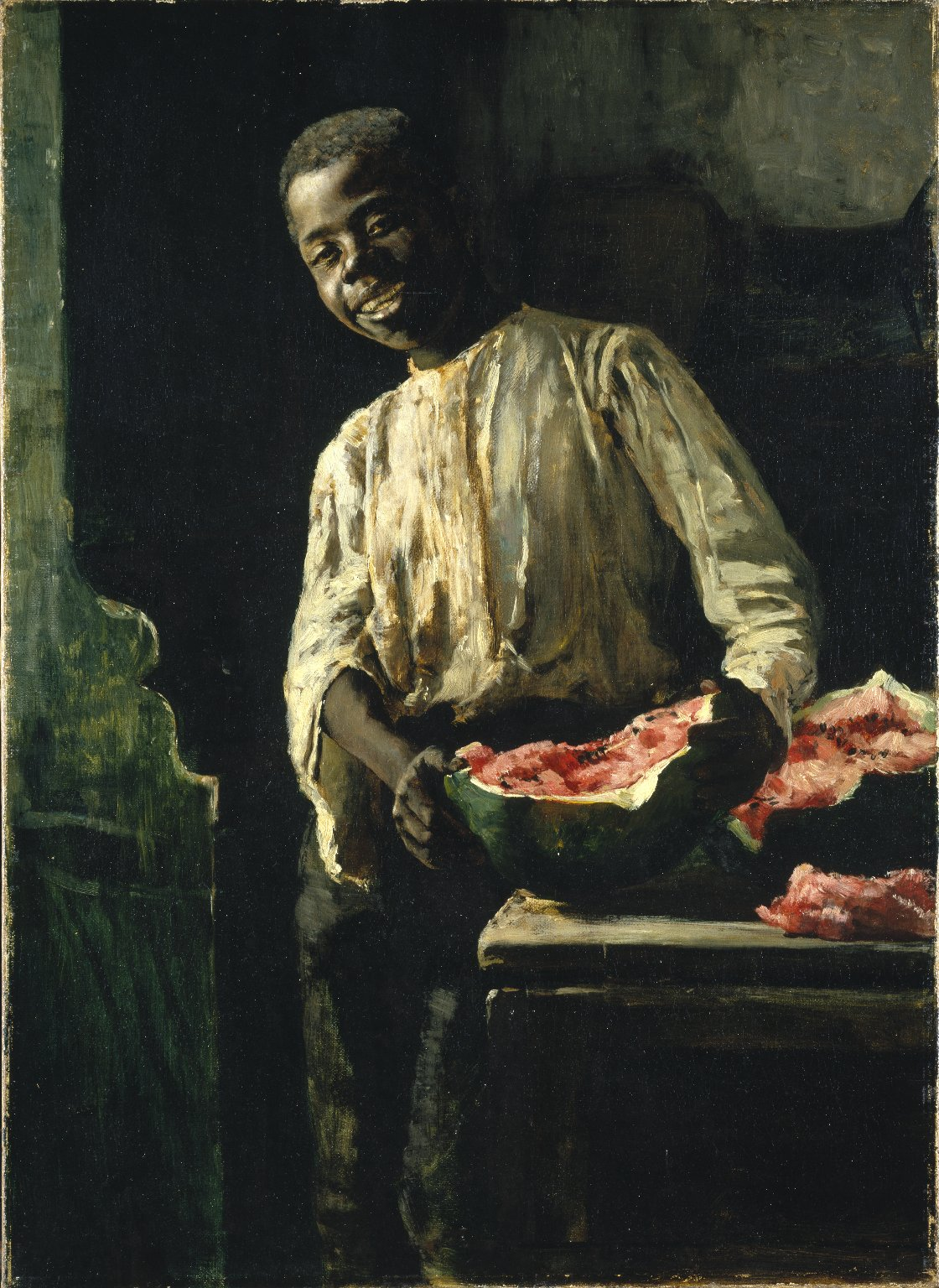
I Know'd It Was Ripe (c.1885), Brooklyn Museum

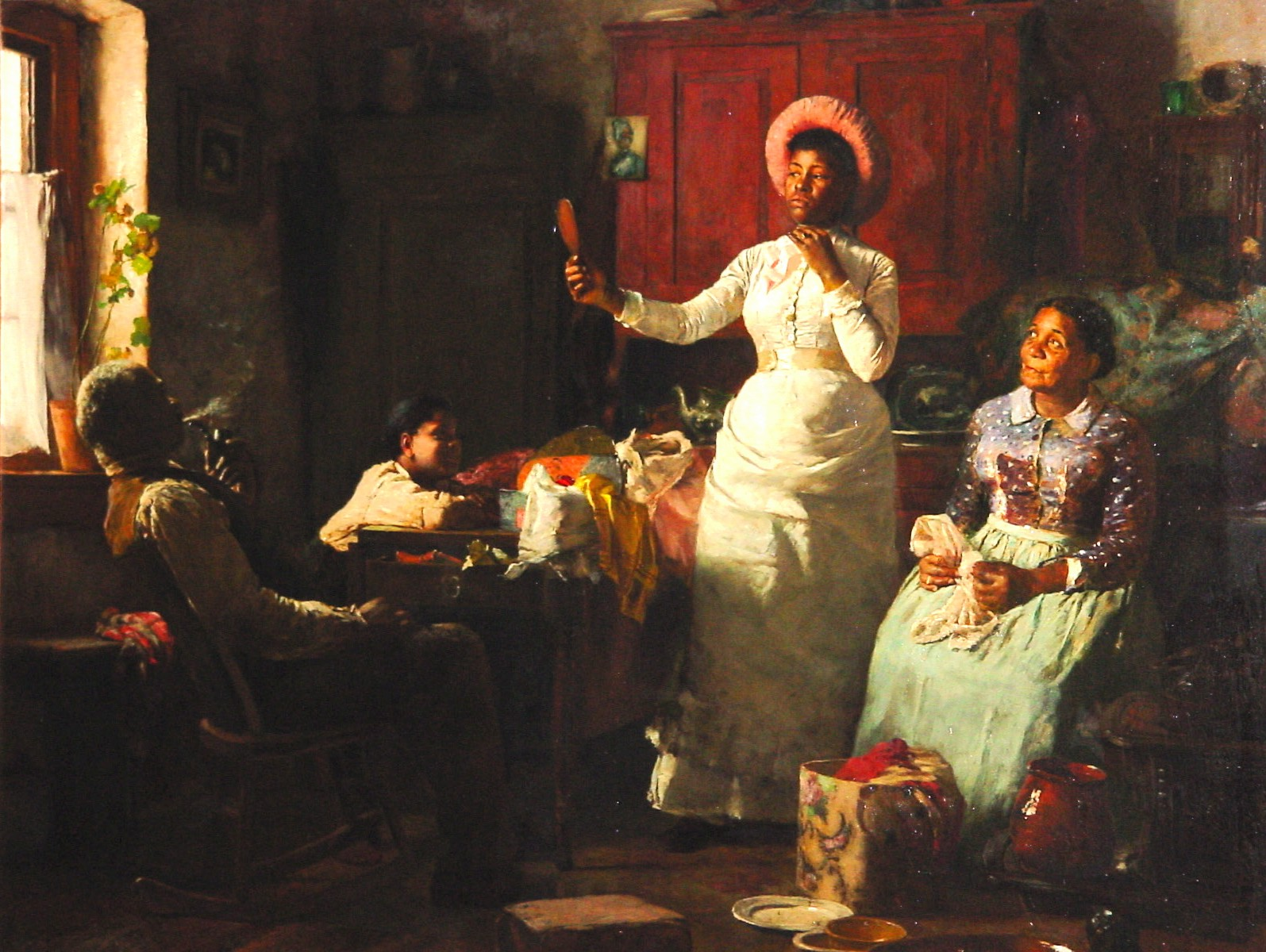
Their Pride [The Bride on Her Wedding Day] (1888), Union League Club of New York
