= Château de Rustéphan =

Castle in France

Coordinates: 47°51′32″N 3°46′2″W

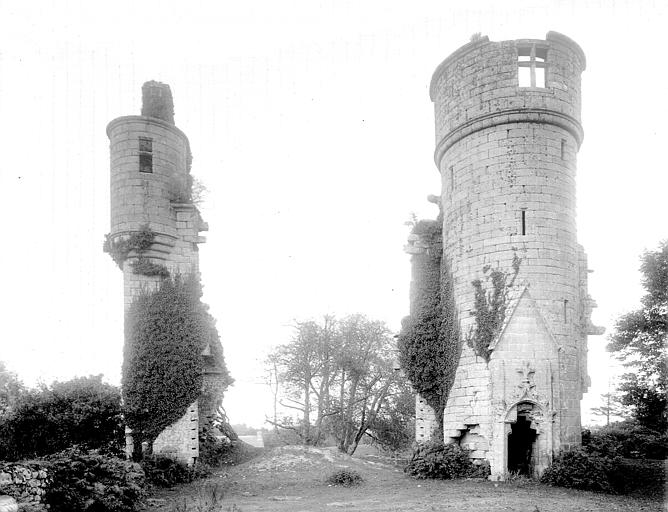
Château de Rustéphan

The Château de Rustéphan is a small, ruined 15th–16th-century manor-house in Nizon, part of the commune of Pont-Aven in the Finistère département of France. It was erected by Jean du Faou, chamberlain of France and grand seneschal of Brittany, who built the domaine in 1420.

== History ==
The original manor was built by the son of a Duke of Brittany, named Étienne, Count of Penthièvre, and seigneur of Nizon, who died in 1137.

The current structure was built by Jean du Faou. According to some historians, it was a former hunting lodge of the Dukes of Brittany, in the 15th and 16th centuries. Its position at the entrance of a large wood that covers the entire parish of Nizon, and which abounds in game, makes this plausible.

During the French Revolution, more than half of the manor house was burned and destroyed.

== Architecture ==
Of the ancient manor-house, nothing remains but two sections about 20 metres (66 ft) in height, surrounded by ivy, brambles, and weeds. The section on the left, the gable wall, contains a corner turret on corbelling, immense hooded fireplaces as well as the remains of some stone cross-pieced windows. The section on the right contains the staircase tower, as well as some remains of internal walls, the entrance vestibule, etc. The main entry door is topped by a Gothic arch. The former wall of the front façade has fallen away and the stones were carried off in the last century to be used in local farm buildings.

It is believed that the manor house once consisted of a rectangular corps de logis and had turrets at each of the corners, as well as a large central staircase tower.

== Legends ==
Nearly all the residents of Nizon believe that the ghosts of former village residents Géneviève de Rustéphan and Iannick ar Flécher still haunt the château today. This true 16th-century story is a tragic tale of a commoner (Iannick) who fell in love with the daughter (Géneviève) of the local seigneur of Faou. Their two families did not approve of the relationship, and Iannick was forced to leave and become a priest. The young woman died broken-hearted and her spirit is said to haunt the ruins to this day. It has been reported that the apparition of an old, sad priest (Iannick) has also been seen lurking around the ruins. Village inhabitants used to gather in the grassy space in front of the ruins to dance and celebrate various holidays, but after numerous reported sightings of unexplained figures seen watching them from within the ruins, they learned to stay away from the place on moonlit nights when the spirits were said to appear.

== Preservation ==
The local people of Nizon are trying to save the remains of the château from further vandalism and the effects of the weather. There is an effort underway to reinforce the walls and tower and try to keep the structure from falling.

The castle has been listed as a monument historique (historical monument) by the French Ministry of Culture since 1926.

== See also ==
- List of castles in France
