= Aven (river) =

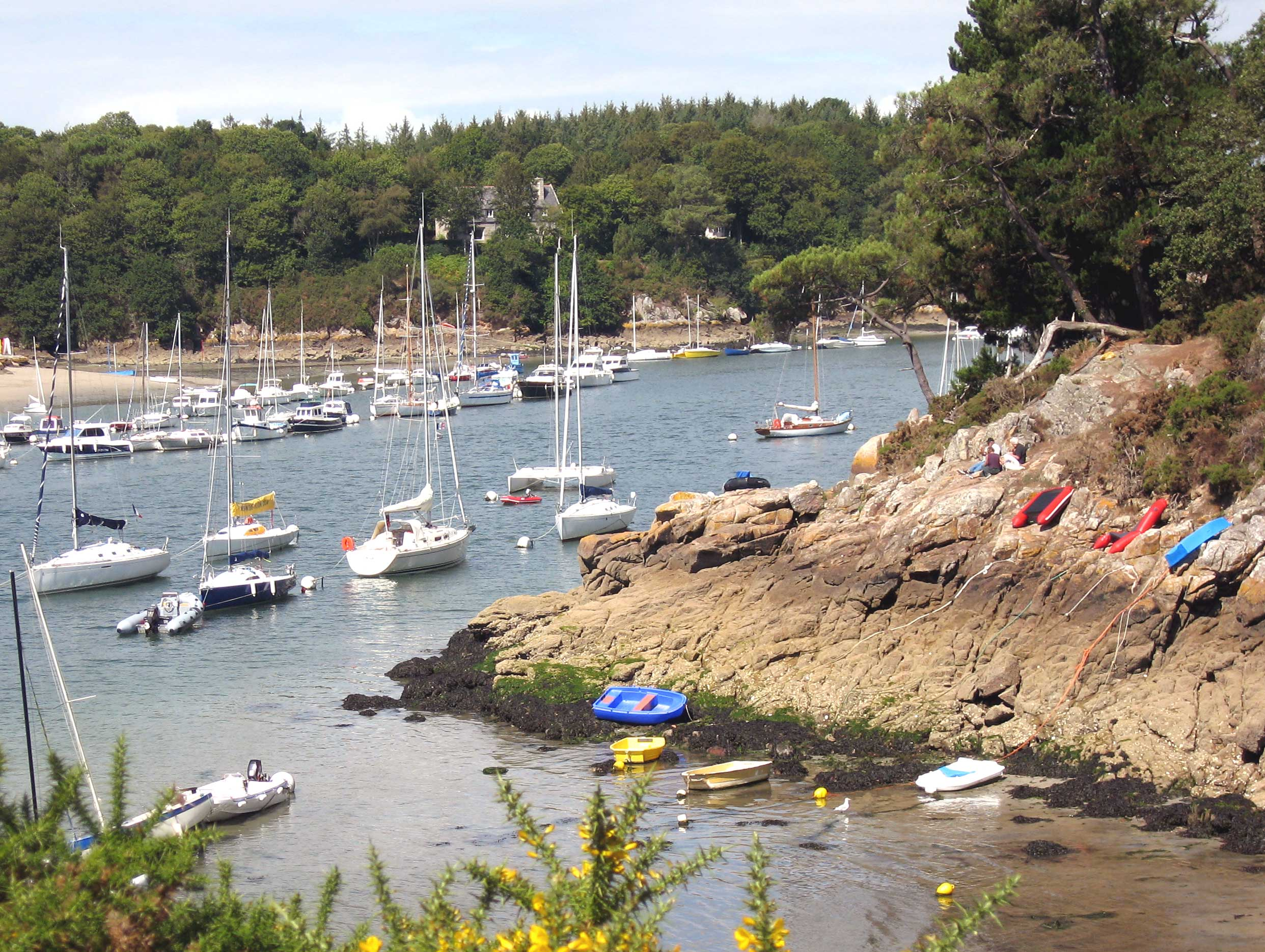

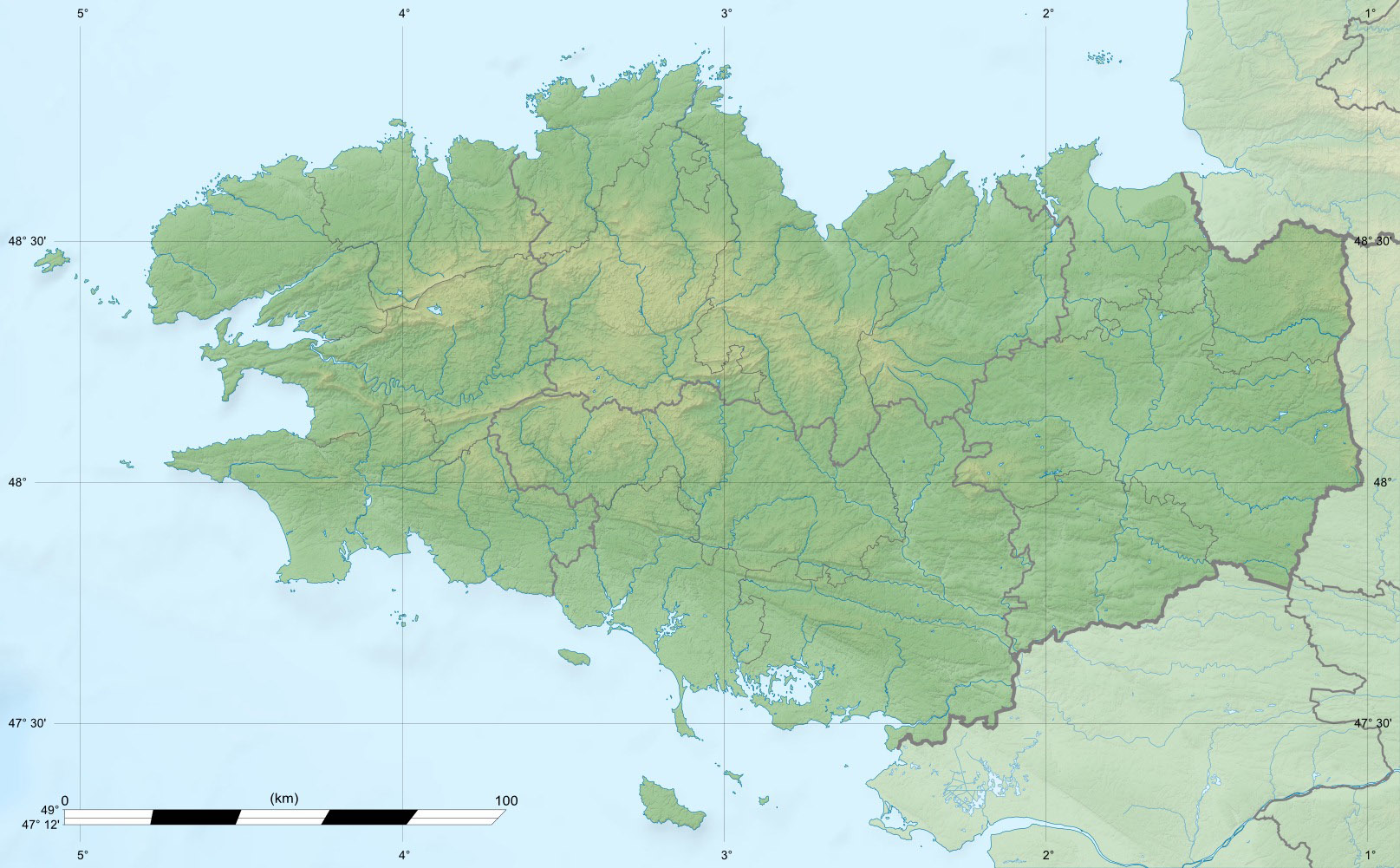
- Location within France Location within Brittany
- Native name: L'Aven (French)

Location
- Country: France

Physical characteristics
- Source
  - location: Brittany
- Mouth
  - location: Atlantic Ocean
  - coordinates: 47°48′6″N 3°44′7″W
- Length: 39.3 km (24.4 mi)

The Aven (French pronunciation: [avɛn]) is a natural watercourse on the south coast of Brittany, France. It is 39.3 km (24.4 mi) long. Its source is near Coray. It flows in a generally southerly direction through Rosporden and Pont-Aven before discharging into the Atlantic Ocean at the seaside resort Port Manec'h, part of Névez. Paul Gauguin spent some of his life living in the town of Pont-Aven, where he enjoyed painting scenes by the river Aven. The waters of the river are rather rapidly flowing and are tidal up until the town of Pont-Aven. The water quality has been tested as slightly alkaline with a pH of 8.50 (at a location in Pont-Aven) where Gauguin was known to have painted his noted Lavenders (Lumina Tech, 2006). Summer water temperature has tested at 17.5 degrees Celsius and electrical conductivity of the river tested to be .19 micro-siemens per centimetre. The waters are relatively clear with Secchi disc tests at Pont-Aven yielding a measurement of 65 centimetres.

== See also ==
- Pont-Aven School
