= The Last Moments of John Brown =

Painting by Thomas Hovenden

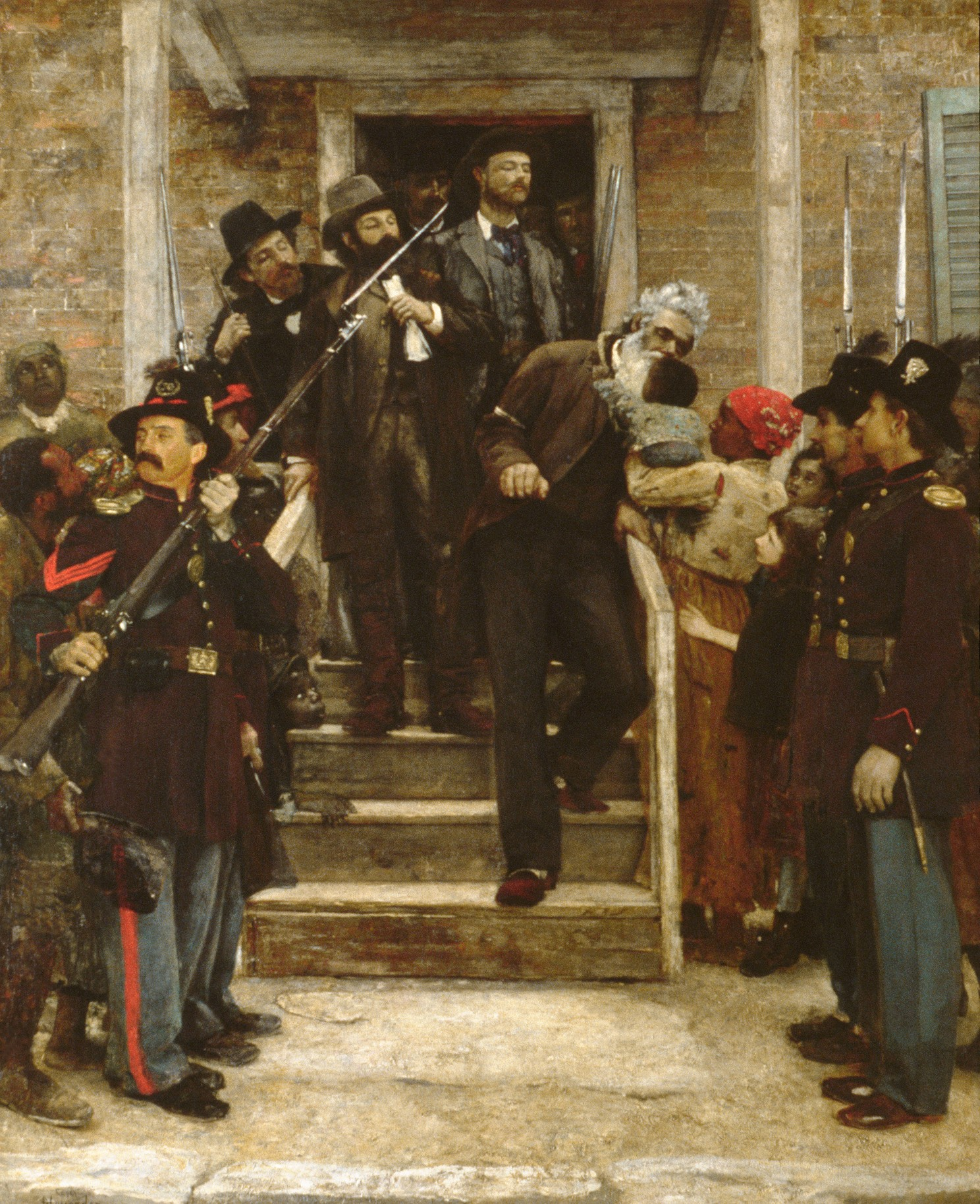
- The original painting by Thomas Hovenden, currently in the collection of the Metropolitan Museum of Art
- Artist: Thomas Hovenden
- Year: 1882–87
- Medium: Oil on canvas
- Dimensions: 196.5 cm × 168.3 cm (77.4 in × 66.3 in)
- Location: Metropolitan Museum of Art; New York City

The Last Moments of John Brown is a late 19th-century painting by Irish-American artist Thomas Hovenden. Done in oil on canvas, the painting depicts American abolitionist John Brown being led to his execution. The painting is on display at the Metropolitan Museum of Art.

== History ==
=== Background ===
In 1859, radical abolitionist John Brown attempted to raid a federal armory in Harpers Ferry, Virginia; Brown's objective was to seize weapons and foment a large-scale slave revolt in the American South. The raid failed; Brown was captured, tried for treason, and executed by hanging in Charles Town, Virginia, on December 2, 1859. While many white Americans disagreed with Brown's actions, some abolitionists in the North saw Brown's raid as a justified-if-misguided attempt to address a moral wrong. This view was quickly reflected in the art and culture of the abolitionist movement, with Brown oftentimes being portrayed as a Christlike martyr.

=== Painting ===
In the years after his death, Brown and his execution became the subject of several notable works of art. In 1882, New York manufacturer Robbins Battell commissioned Irish-American painter Thomas Hovenden to produce a painting of Brown's execution. Hovenden began work on the painting, and originally researched contemporary accounts of Brown's execution. However, in June 1882 Battell sent Hovenden a copy of the fiction-heavy account of Brown's execution published in a 1859 edition of the New York Tribune, and as such Hovenden modeled his painting on this report. He also traveled to Charles Town, West Virginia (where Brown had been executed) to interview those whom had been present during the event. Hovenden completed his work, titled The Last Moments of John Brown, in 1884. Battell was reportedly very pleased with the painting; he paid Hovenden several thousand dollars more than what Hovenden expected, and allowed the artist to copyright the work. Hovenden donated a smaller version of his painting (now in the collection of the Fine Arts Museum of San Francisco), and a woodcut of the painting was published in Harper's Weekly.

The painting eventually came into the possession of Battell's son in law and daughter, Mr. and Mrs. Carl Stoeckel, who gave the work to the Metropolitan Museum of Art in 1897.

The Last Moments of John Brown depicts John Brown being led to his imminent execution. The scene contains a mix of historical details, some accurate and some inaccurate. The work is historical, and is based on a fictionalized account of John Brown's execution. Aspects such as the clothing worn by the subjects in frame are accurate; Hovenden went so far as to interview witnesses to the event, including Brown's jailer. The depiction of Brown kissing a slave child originated in an account of the execution published in the New York Tribune on December 6, 1859, and repeated in other newspapers, illustrations and early biographies. In fact, however, the episode never occurred, as Brown encountered only soldiers and jailors on his way to the gallows.

The painting is stylistically considered to be a work of academic art.
