= War Cross =

War Cross may refer to the following:

- War Cross (Belgium), a decoration awarded by Belgium (French: Croix de guerre or Dutch: Oorlogskruis in the original).
- Croix de Guerre (French), a decoration awarded by France.
- War Cross (Greece), a decoration awarded by Greece (Greek: Πολεμικός Σταυρός in the original).
- War Cross (Norway), a decoration awarded by Norway (Norwegian: Krigskorset in the original).
- The War Cross (Paus), a musical work
- War Cross (Portugal), a decoration awarded by Portugal (Portuguese: Medalha da Cruz de Guerra in the original).
- War Cross (Spain), a decoration awarded by Spain (Spanish: Cruz de Guerra in the original).
- Czechoslovak War Cross 1918, a decoration awarded by the former state of Czechoslovakia during World War I (Czech: Ceskoslovensky valecny kriz in the original).
- Czechoslovak War Cross 1939–1945, a decoration awarded by the former state of Czechoslovakia during World War II (Czech: Ceskoslovensky valecny kriz in the original).
- Louisiana War Cross, a medal awarded to the Louisiana National Guard.
- Luxembourg War Cross, a decoration awarded by Luxembourg (French: Croix de guerre or German: Krieg Kreuz in the original).
- War Cross for Military Valor, a decoration awarded by Italy and established in 1922 (Italian: Croce di Guerra al Valor Militare in the original).
- War Merit Cross (Italy), a decoration awarded by Italy and established in 1918 (Italian: Croce di Guerra in the original).

War Cross may refer also refer to:

- War Cross, the name used on cemetery plans for the Cross of Sacrifice erected in Commonwealth War Graves Commission sites.

== See also ==
- Military Cross, a British decoration established in 1914, also used in other Commonwealth countries
- Order of the Military Cross, a Polish order established in 2006 (Polish: Order Krzyża Wojskowego in the original)
