= Pont-Aven =

- Commune
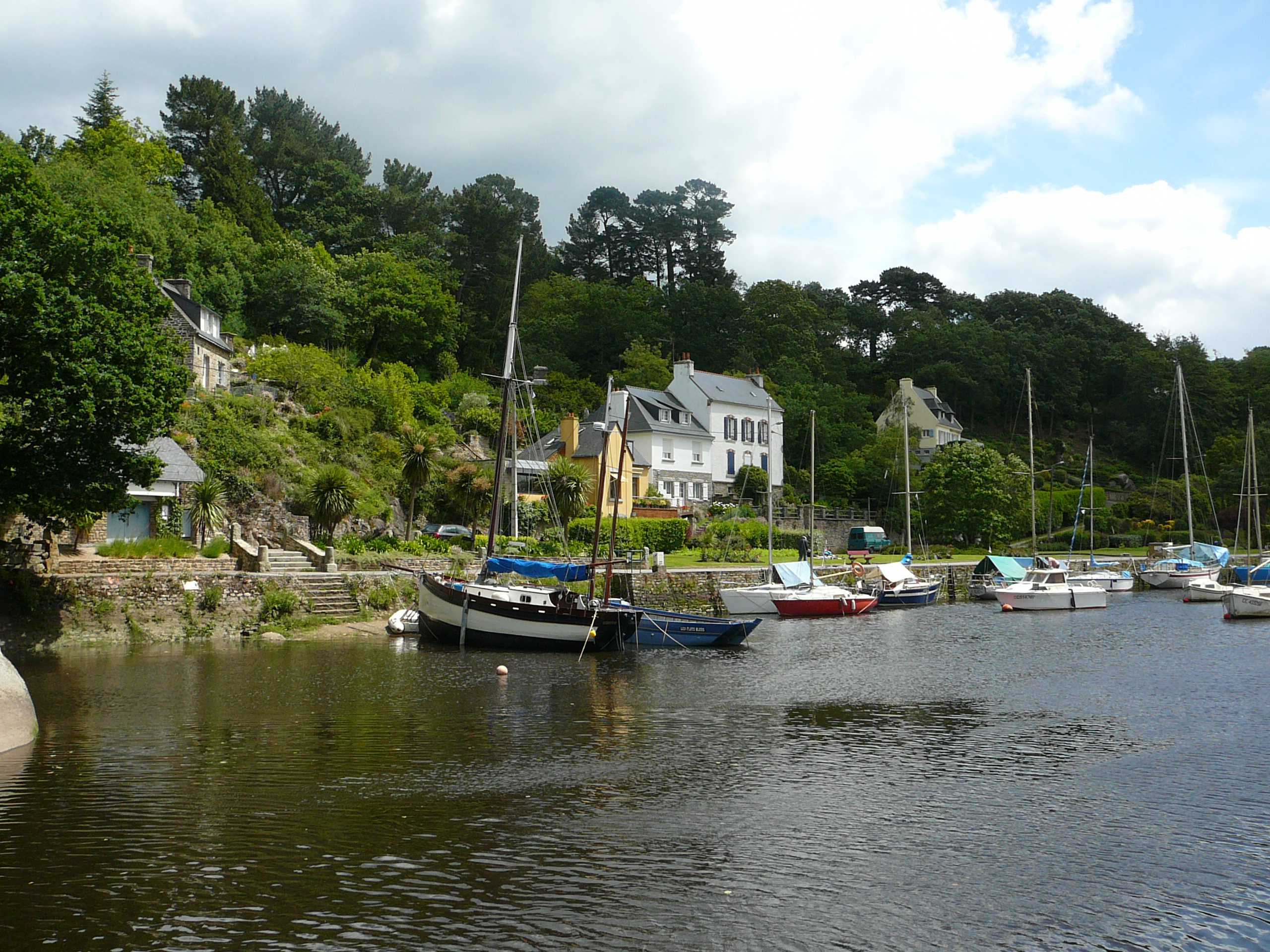
- Port of Pont-Aven

- Coat of arms
- Location of Pont-Aven
- Location within France Location within Brittany
- Coordinates: 47°51′23″N 3°44′45″W
- Country: France
- Region: Brittany
- Department: Finistère
- Arrondissement: Quimper
- Canton: Moëlan-sur-Mer
- Intercommunality: Concarneau Cornouaille Agglomération

Government
  - Mayor (2020–2026): Christian Dautel
- Area^{1}: 28.63 km^{2} (11.05 sq mi)
- Highest elevation: 102 m (335 ft)
- Lowest elevation: 0 m (0 ft)
- Population (2023): 2,777
  - Density: 97.00/km^{2} (251.2/sq mi)
- Time zone: UTC+01:00 (CET)
  - Summer (DST): UTC+02:00 (CEST)
- INSEE/Postal code: 29217 /29930
- ^{1} French Land Register data, which excludes lakes, ponds, glaciers > 1 km^{2} (0.386 sq mi or 247 acres) and river estuaries.

Pont-Aven (French pronunciation: [pɔ̃t‿avɛn]; lit. 'River Bridge' in Breton) is a commune in the Finistère department in the Brittany region in Northwestern France.

== Demographics ==
Inhabitants of Pont-Aven are called Pontavenistes in French. Pont-Aven absorbed the former commune of Nizon in 1954, which had a population of 1,837 at the time.

Historical population

Year	Pop.	±% p.a.
1793	677	—
1800	720	+0.88%
1806	615	−2.59%
1821	762	+1.44%
1831	833	+0.89%
1836	824	−0.22%
1841	834	+0.24%
1846	939	+2.40%
1851	1,030	+1.87%
1856	986	−0.87%
1861	1,060	+1.46%
1866	1,065	+0.09%
1872	1,131	+1.01%
1876	1,267	+2.88%
1881	1,388	+1.84%
1886	1,516	+1.78%
1891	1,589	+0.95%
1896	1,657	+0.84%
1901	1,746	+1.05%

Year	Pop.	±% p.a.
1906	1,827	+0.91%
1911	1,927	+1.07%
1921	1,750	−0.96%
1926	1,792	+0.48%
1931	1,678	−1.31%
1936	1,818	+1.62%
1946	2,040	+1.16%
1954	1,806	−1.51%
1962	3,699	+9.38%
1968	3,684	−0.07%
1975	3,530	−0.61%
1982	3,295	−0.98%
1990	3,031	−1.04%
1999	2,960	−0.26%
2007	2,977	+0.07%
2012	2,843	−0.92%
2017	2,801	−0.30%
2023	2,777	−0.14%

Source: EHESS and INSEE (1968–2023)

== Map ==
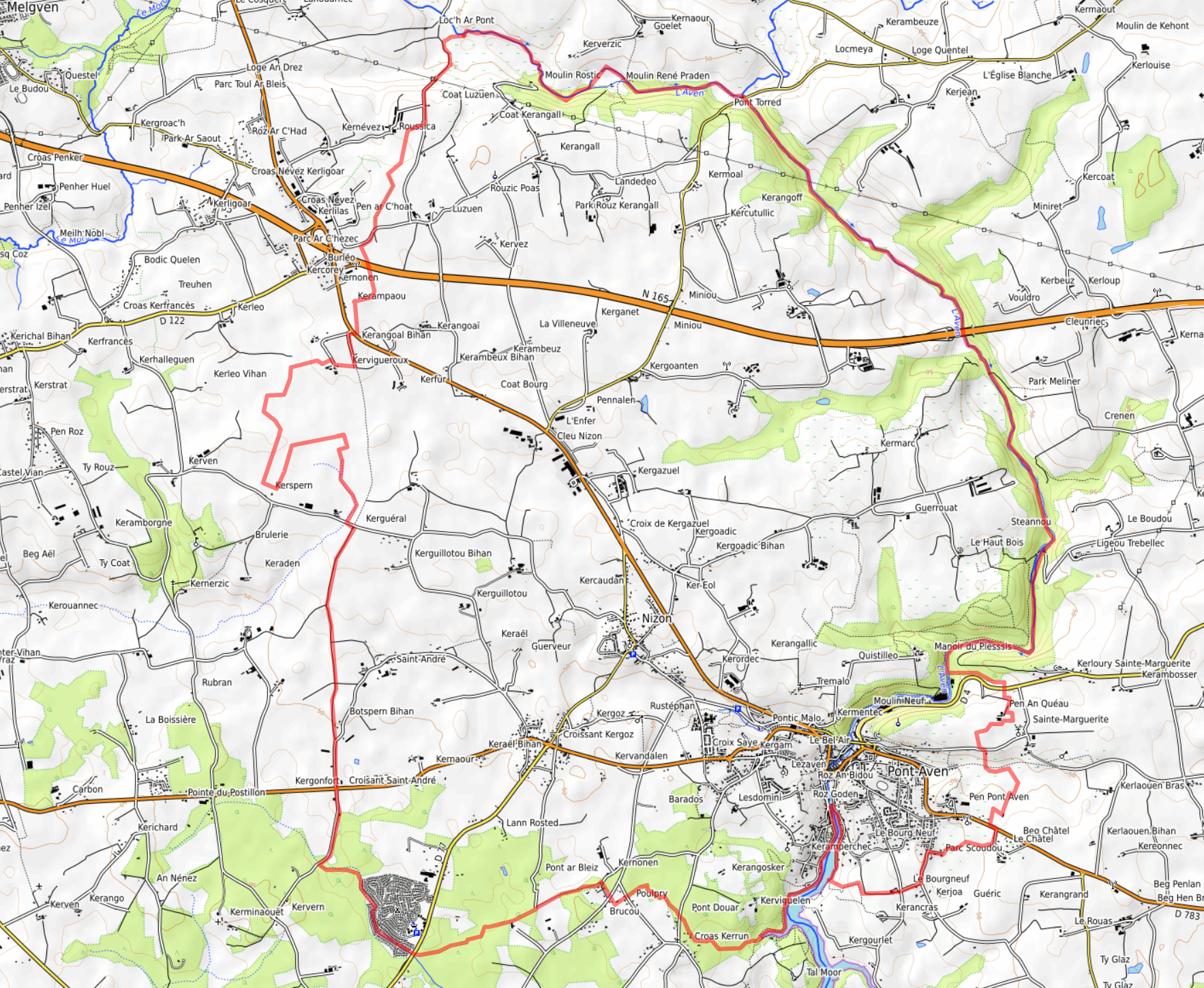
Topographic map

== History ==
Pont-Aven is mentioned among the towns which took part in the Breton anti-tax Rebellion of the Red Bonnets against Louis XIV of France in 1675.

== Arts ==
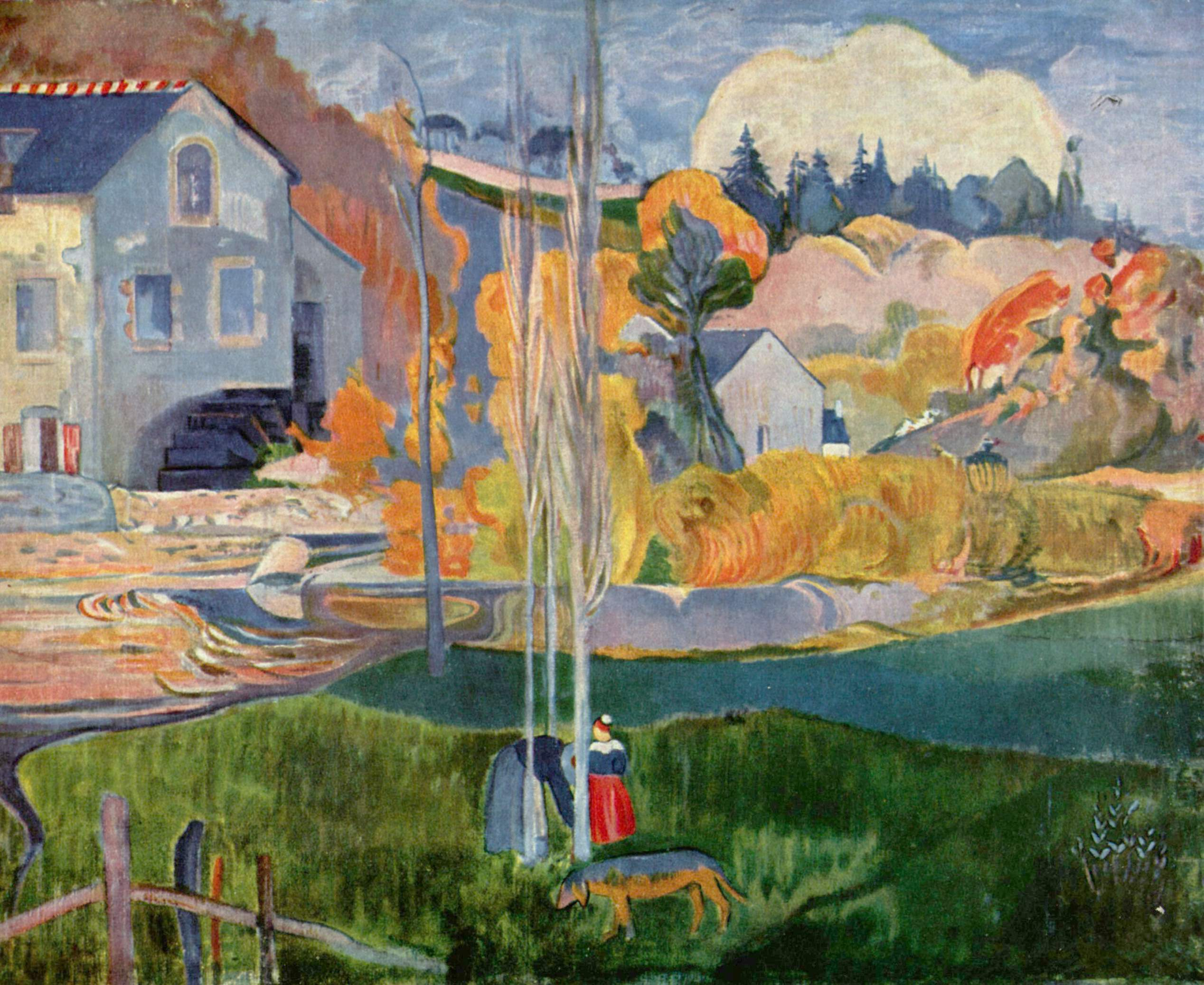
Watermill in Pont-Aven, by Paul Gauguin, 1894

Pont-Aven is mainly known because of the group of artists who flocked round Émile Bernard and Paul Gauguin, and who were joined in 1888 by Paul Sérusier. They were collectively known as "Pont-Aven School" (French: École de Pont-Aven, Breton: Skol Pont-Aven).

Pont Aven School of Contemporary Art (PASCA) is an international fine arts program located in the historic artists' colony of Pont-Aven (Brittany, France). The student body is made up of third-year university or art college honors students or post-baccalaureate art majors (fourth/fifth-year) seeking further study.

The Musée des Beaux Arts de Pont-Aven houses a historical reconstruction of Pont-Aven at the end of the 19th century as well as a permanent collection dedicated to the Pont-Aven School.

Pont Aven still attracts artists and art lovers with many commercial galleries in addition to the town's public gallery.

== Geography ==
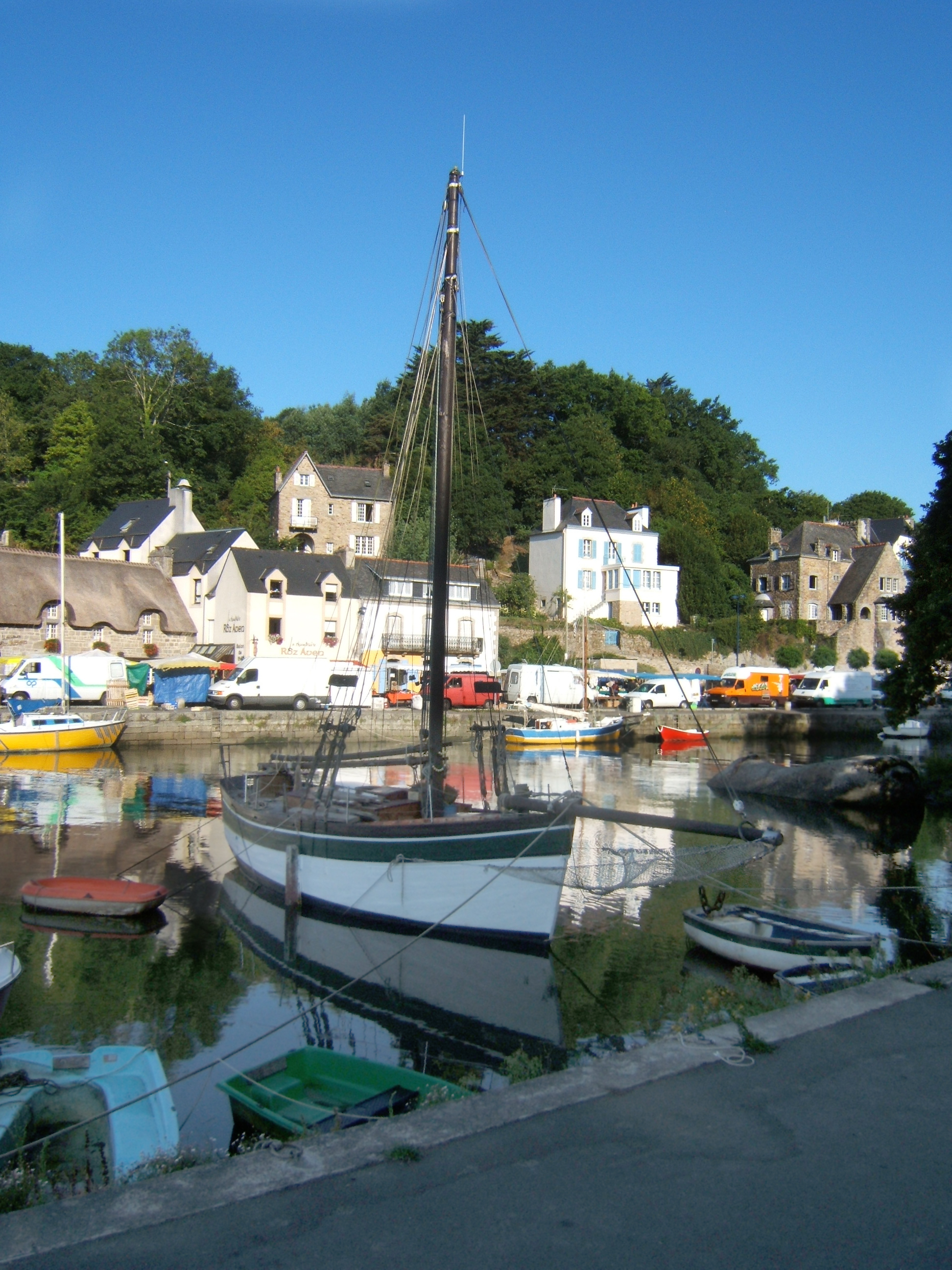
Port of Pont-Aven

The river Aven runs through Pont-Aven. The river has relatively favourable water quality, with pH levels slightly alkaline at about 8.5 and electrical conductivity of 19 micro Siemens per centimetre.

The town is at the interface of the tidal estuary and the freshwater river.

== Sights ==
Before Pont-Aven attracted Gauguin and other artists it was a centre for milling with the river Aven being divided above the town to provide a mill race which powers a series of water mills. Whilst several of these retain their wheels only the last, the Moulin Poulguin, is still capable of operating. The mill is now a restaurant and you can see the machinery inside.

Just outside the town are the beech woods of the Bois d'Amour, a source of inspiration for many artists. The town is close to Domaine de Kerlann Holiday Park on the road to the adjoining commune of Nevez. To the northwest of the town, in the small community of Nizon, the ruins of Château de Rustéphan are to be found. Nizon was more famous than Pont-Aven at the 19th century but the painters made it well known.

== Popular culture ==
The Brittany Ferries flagship is named after the town.

Les Galettes de Pont-Aven is a 1975 drama on the life of a middle-aged aspirant painter who settles in the town.

Pont-Aven is the setting for Death in Brittany (2012), the first book in the series of Commissaire Dupin detective novels by Jean-Luc Bannalec (Jörg Bong).

== See also ==
- Communes of the Finistère department
- Musée des Beaux-Arts de Pont-Aven
- Paroisse de Pont-Aven
