= Pont-Aven School =

Art movement

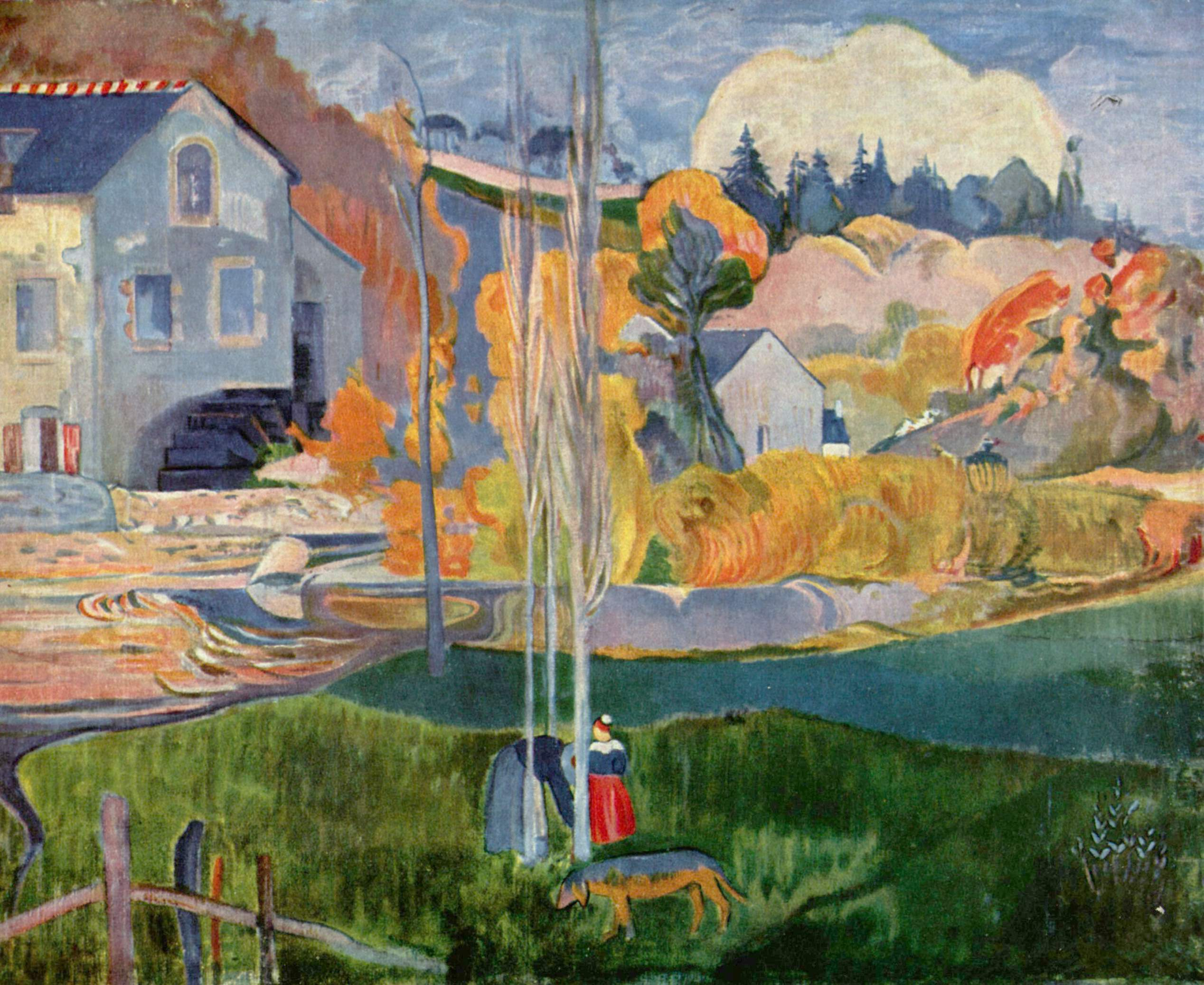
Paul Gauguin, Watermill in Pont-Aven, 1894, Musée d'Orsay, Paris

Pont-Aven School (French: École de Pont-Aven; Breton: Skol Pont Aven) encompasses works of art influenced by the Breton town of Pont-Aven and its surroundings. Originally the term applied to works created in the artists' colony at Pont-Aven, which started to emerge in the 1850s and lasted until the beginning of the 20th century. Many of the artists were inspired by the works of Paul Gauguin, who spent extended periods in the area in the late 1880s and early 1890s. Their work is frequently characterised by the bold use of pure colour and their Symbolist choice of subject matter.

== Background ==
Pont-Aven is a commune of the Finistère département, in Brittany, France, some distance inland from where the river Aven meets the Atlantic Ocean. From the 1850s painters began to frequent the village of Pont-Aven, wanting to spend their summers away from the city, on a low budget in a picturesque place not yet spoilt by tourism. Gauguin first worked in Pont-Aven in 1886. When he returned in 1888, the situation had changed: Pont-Aven was already crowded, and Gauguin looked for an alternative place to work which he found, in 1889, in Le Pouldu (today part of the community of Clohars-Carnoët), some miles off to the East at the mouth of the river Laïta, traditionally the border of the Morbihan département. There, Gauguin, accompanied by Meijer de Haan, Charles Filiger and for a while by Sérusier, spent the winter of 1889/1890 and several months afterwards.

== History ==
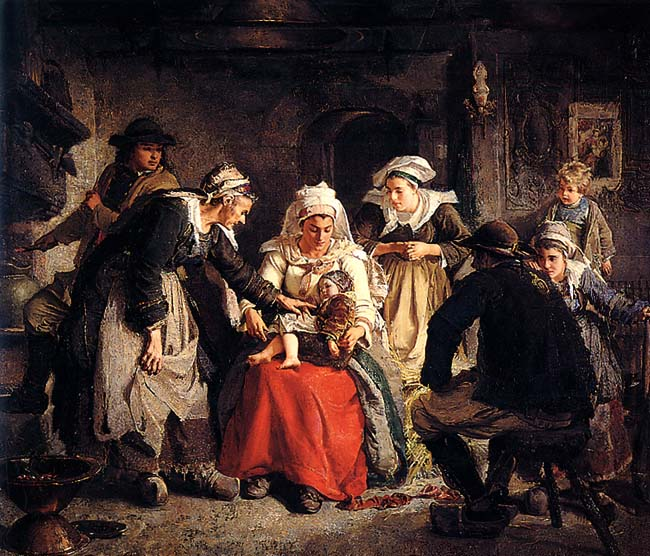
Robert Wylie: La Sorcière bretonne (1872)

The opening of the railway line from Paris to Quimper in 1862 encouraged tourism in Brittany. The first group of artists to arrive in Pont-Aven during the summer of 1866 consisted of art students from Philadelphia including Henry Bacon, Robert Wylie, C. J. Way, Earl Shinn and Howard Roberts. They were soon joined by three other Americans, Benjamin Champney, Frederick Bridgeman and Moses Wright, by two English painters, Lewis and Carraway, and by two Frenchmen. Over the next 15 years, the reputation of the colony spread far and wide, attracting many other painters. Jean-Léon Gérôme, one of the leading French Academic painters, encouraged his American students to go there, while French landscape artists such as William Bouguereau, Louis-Nicolas Cabat and Paul Sébillot also spent summers in the village. Among the other foreigners to visit were Herman van den Anker from the Netherlands, Augustus Burke from Ireland and Paul Peel from Canada. The English illustrator Randolph Caldecott visited in 1880. He illustrated Henry Blackburn's Breton Folk: An Artistic Tour of Brittany (1880), one of the most popular guide-books of the time. His naive illustrations caught the imagination of the avant-garde visiting artists and Gauguin in particular, who is known to have imitated Caldecott's style in his drawings his first summer at Pont-Aven.

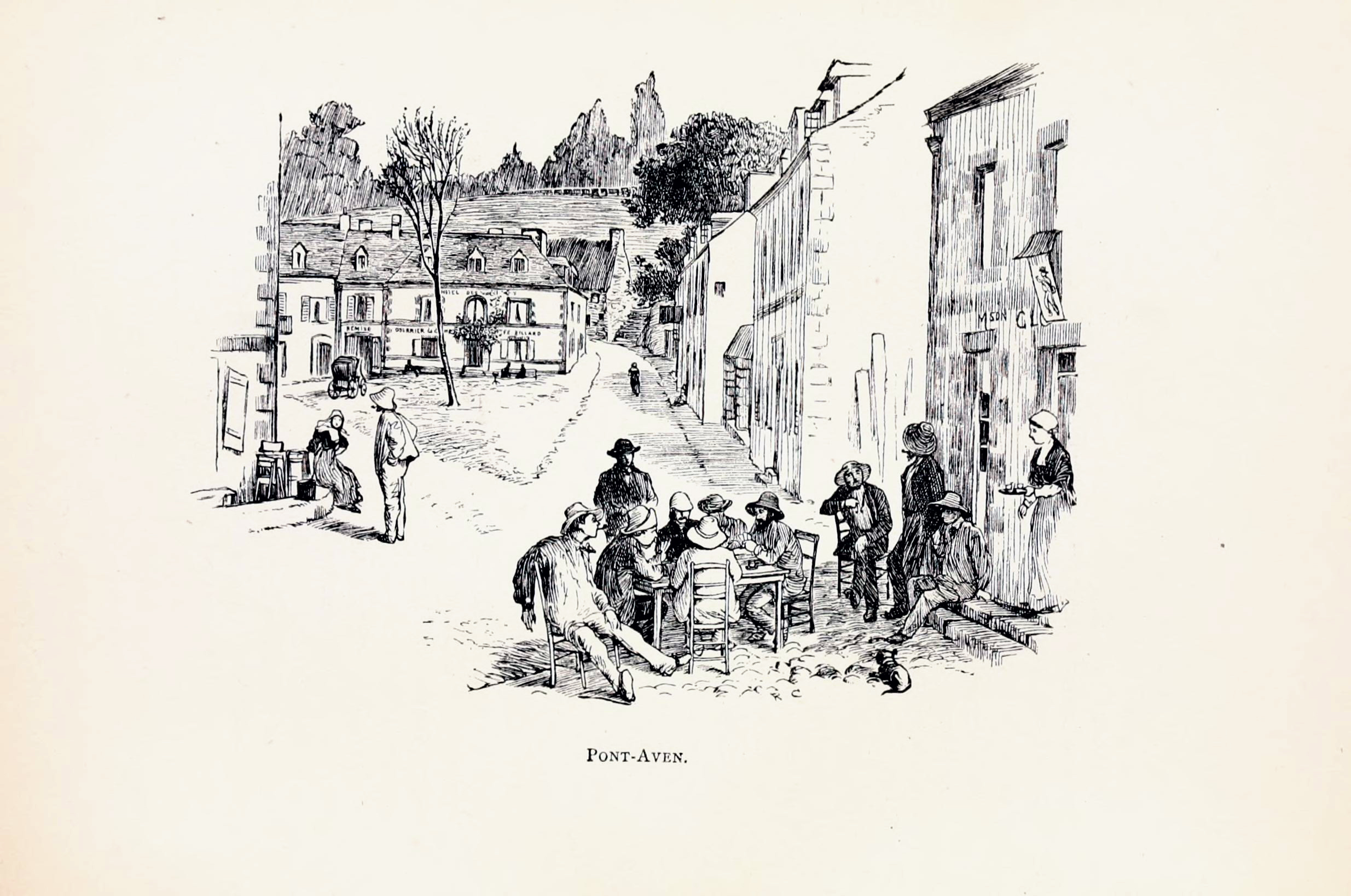
Randolph Caldecott, Pont-Aven, 1881

There were three hotels ready to accommodate visitors: the Hôtel de Voyageurs, the Hôtel du Lion d'Or and the Pension Gloanec. The Pension Gloanec, where Gauguin and his circle lodged, was especially cheap. When Blackburn visited it offered demi-pension, i.e. board, breakfast and evening meal with cider thrown in, for just sixty francs a month. The artists were attracted by the beauty of the surrounding countryside and the low cost of living. Many of them were looking for a new point of departure, hoping to break away from the Academic style of the École des Beaux-Arts and from Impressionism which was beginning to decline. Brittany opened up new horizons with its language, traditional dress, fervent Catholic belief, an oral tradition and the ubiquitous presence of granite crosses and churches.

The two most innovative painters to arrive on the scene were Paul Gauguin and Émile Bernard. Gauguin had reached in Pont-Aven in July 1886 while Bernard came later in the summer. When the two met again two years later, they consolidated their relationship. Bernard showed Gauguin his The Pardon (1888), which some believe inspired Gauguin to paint his Vision après le sermon, Bernard claiming he was the first to adopt the approach, which became known as Synthetism. Other artists who stayed with Gauguin, first at the Pension Gloanec in Pont-Aven and later at the Buvette de la Plage in Le Pouldu, were Charles Filiger, Meijer de Haan, Charles Laval, Robert Bevan, Roderic O'Conor, Émile Schuffenecker, Armand Séguin and Władysław Ślewiński. After his first voyage to Tahiti in 1891, Gauguin returned to Pont-Aven for the last time in 1894, once again staying with his circle of friends at the Pension Gloanec.

== Synthetism ==
The style developed in Pont-Aven by Gauguin and Bernard was known as Synthetism as it was designed to synthetise or combine images, producing a new result which was quite different from Impressionism. It relied on a number of principles including the abandonment of faithful representation, the creation of a work based on the artist's memory of the subject but reflecting his feelings while painting, bold application of pure colour, the absence of perspective and shading, the application of Cloisonnism's flat forms separated by dark contours, and geometrical composition free of any unnecessary detail and trimmings.

== Gallery ==
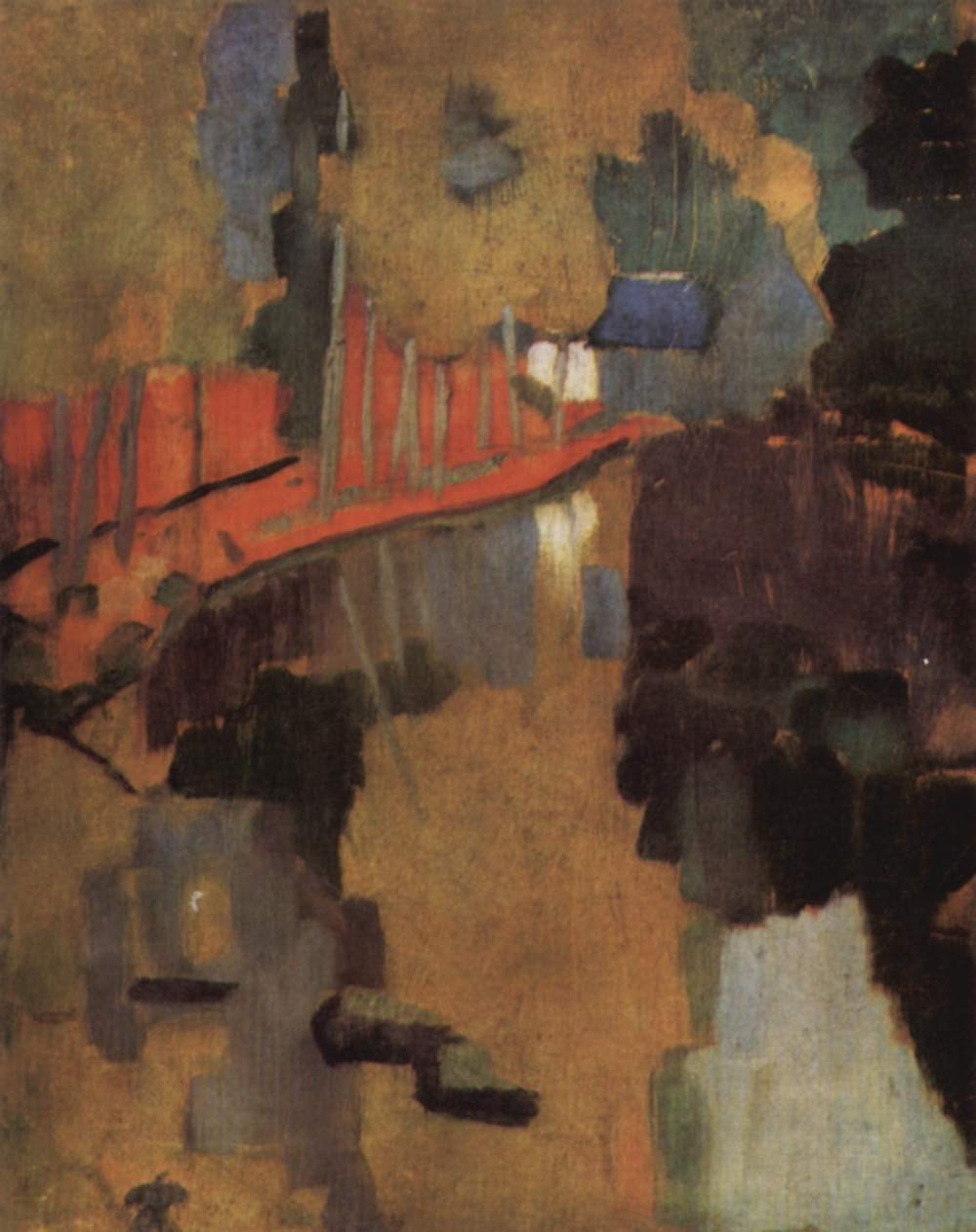
Paul Sérusier, The Talisman, the Aven at the Bois d'Amour 1888

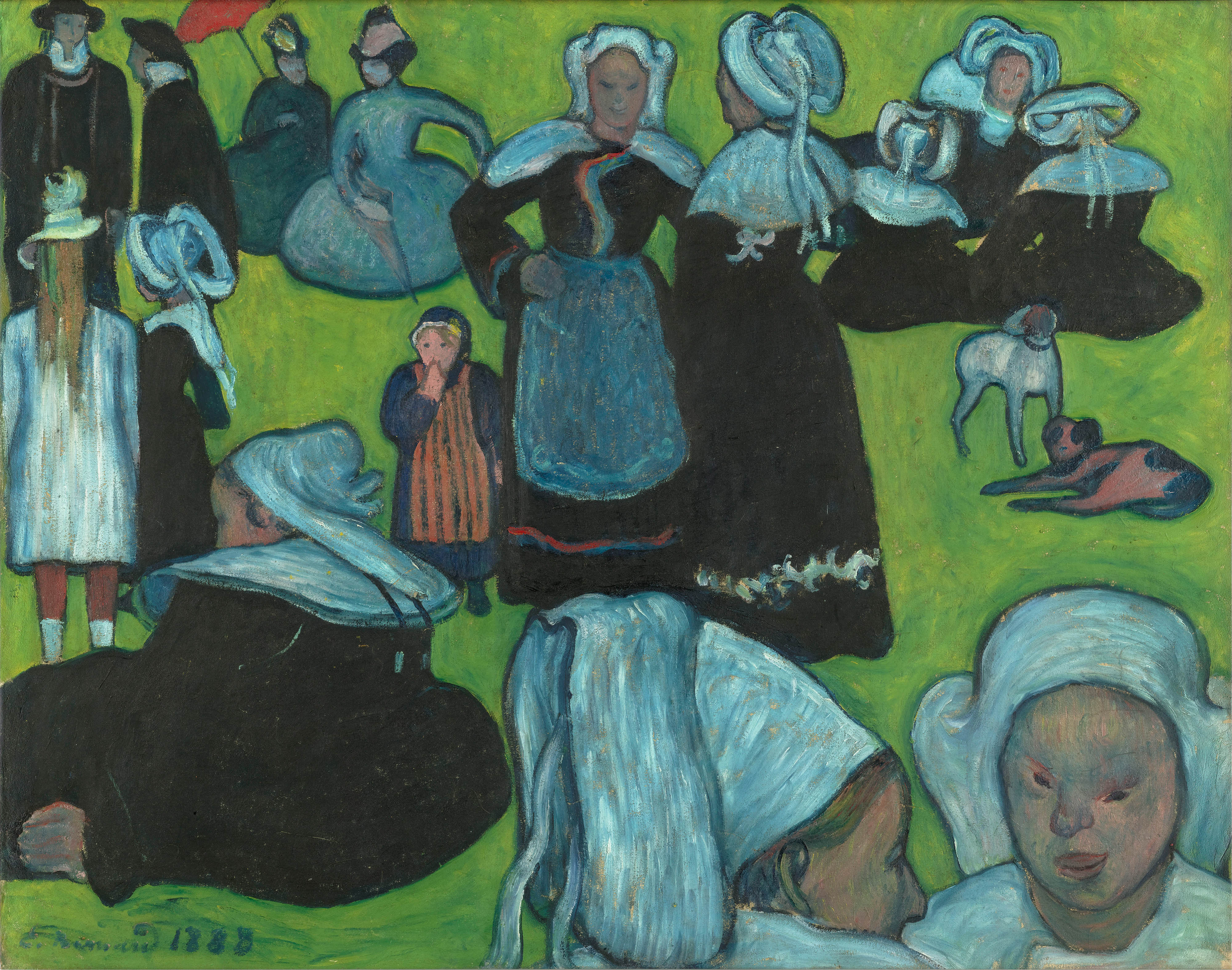
Émile Bernard, The Pardon 1888.

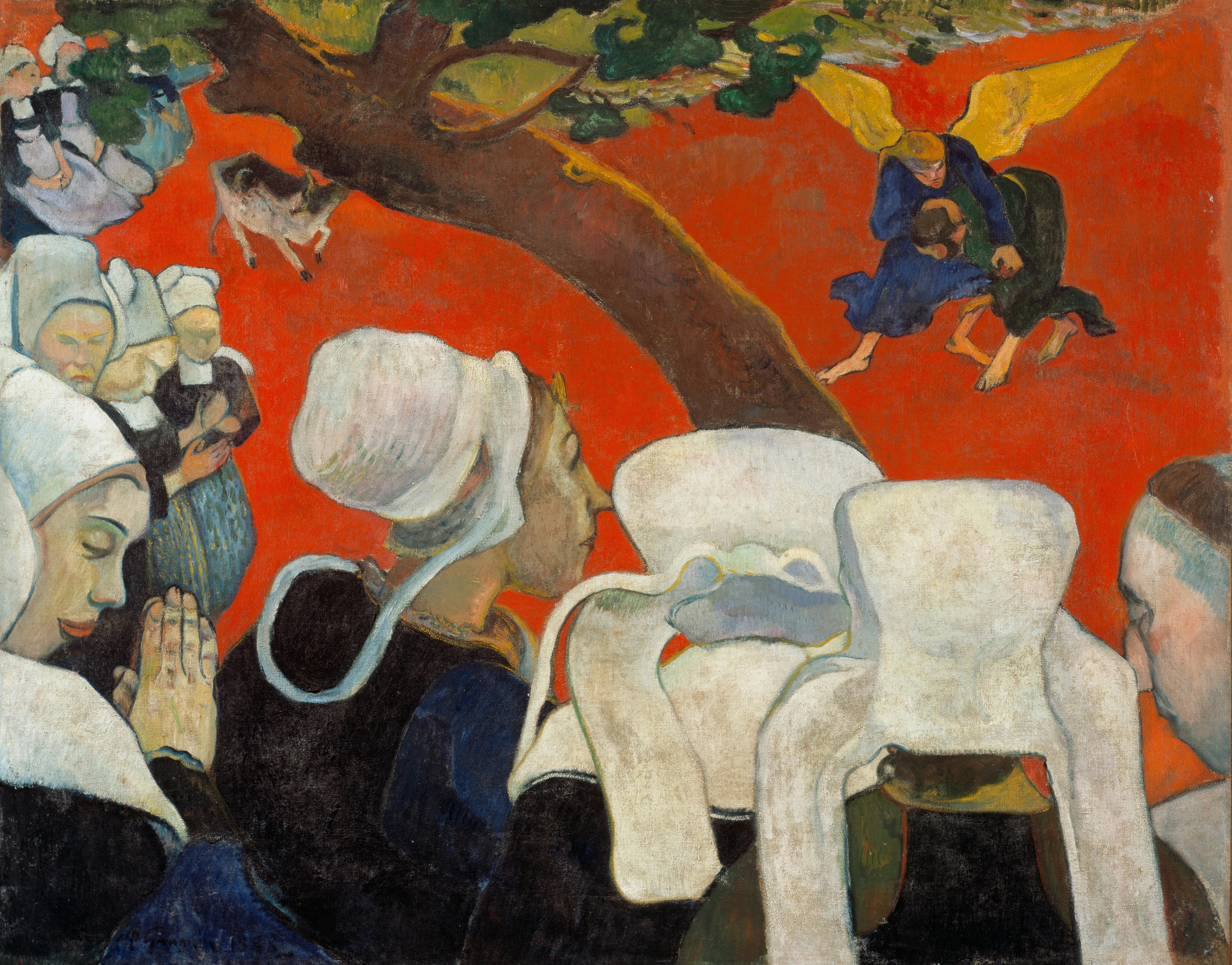
Paul Gauguin, Vision After the Sermon (Jacob wrestling with the angel), (1888), National Gallery of Scotland

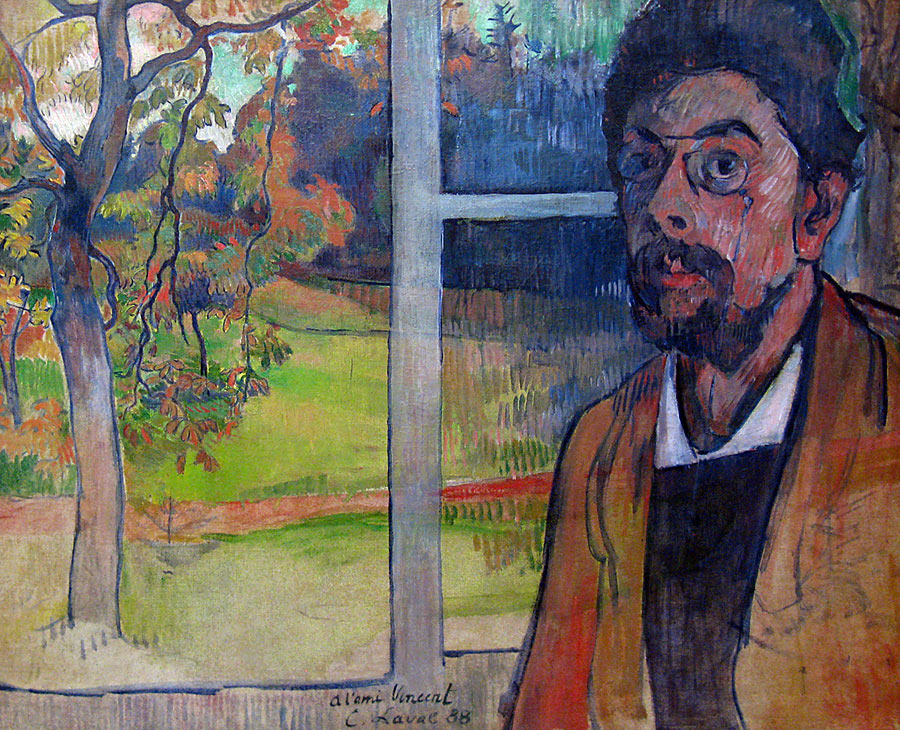
Charles Laval, Self Portrait, 1888, oil on canvas, 50 x 60 cm Van Gogh Museum, Amsterdam

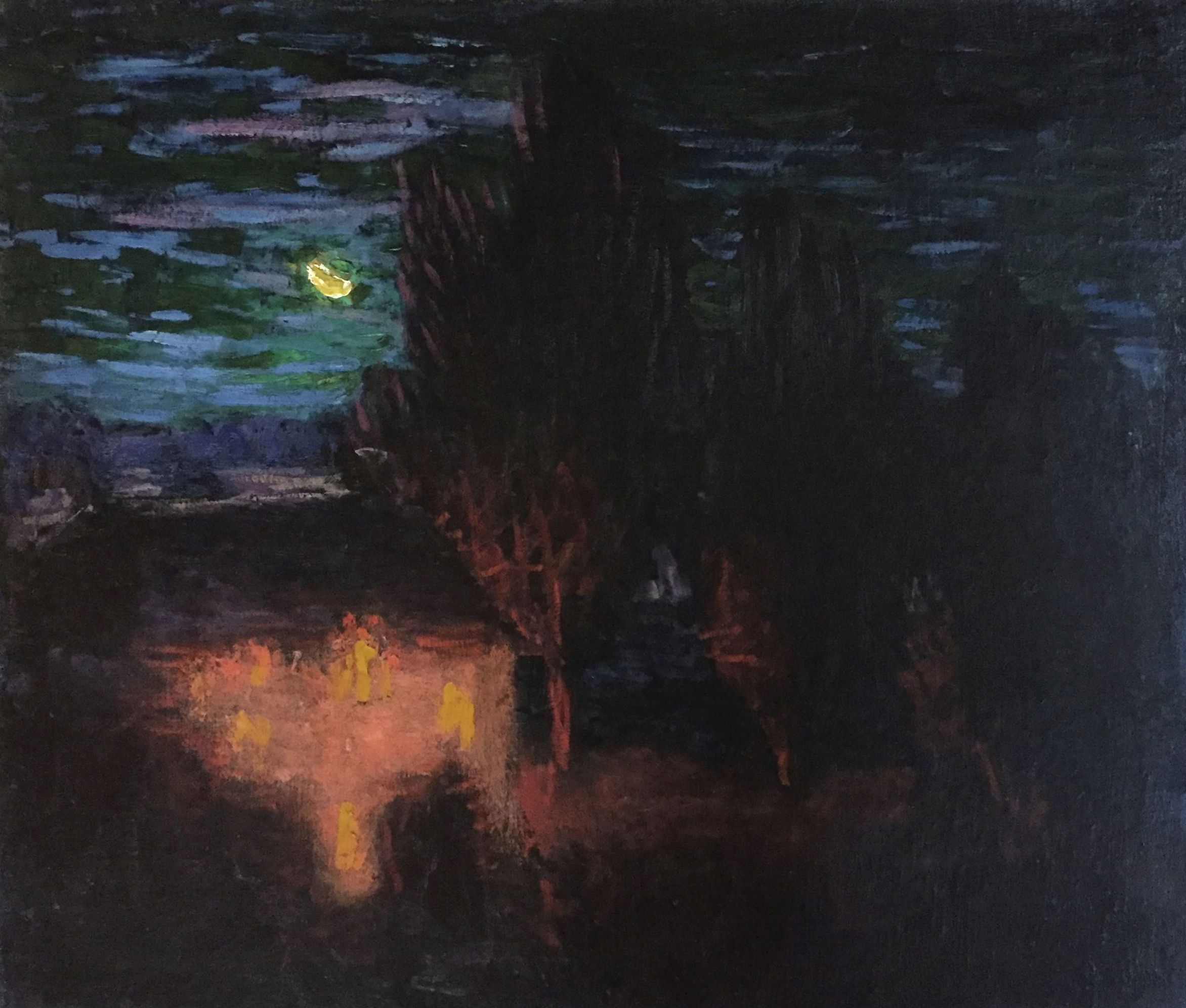
Les Korrigans sous la lune – The dance of the elves of Pont-Aven (Moonlit landscape with tall trees) by Roderic O'Conor, ca. 1898–1900

== Artists working in Pont-Aven (or Le Pouldu) ==
Arranged by year of arrival:

- Otto Weber (1832–1888), German, 1863
- Henry Bacon (1839–1912), American, 1864
- Charles Way, American, 1864
- Robert Wylie (1839–1877), American, 1864 until death
- Frederick Bridgman, American, (1847–1928), 1866
- Benjamin Champney (1817–1907), American, 1866
- Earl Shinn (1838–1886), American, 1866
- Howard Roberts, (1843–1900), American, c. 1866
- Herman van den Anker, (1832–1883), Dutch, 1868
- William Bouguereau, (1825–1893), French, 1868
- Louis Cabat, (1812–1893), French, c. 1868
- Milne Ramsey, (1847–1915), American, 1870
- Clement Nye Swift, (1846–1918), American, 1870
- Paul Sébillot, (1843–1918), French, 1873
- Julian Alden Weir, American, (1852–1919), 1874
- Augustus Burke, (1838–1891), Irish, 1875
- William Lamb Picknell, (1853–1897), American, 1876
- Alexandre Defaux, (1826–1900), French, 1876
- Thomas Hovenden, (1840–1895), Irish-American, 1876
- Frank C. Penfold, (1849–1921), American, 1877 until death
- Henry Mosler, (1841–1920), American, 1879
- Thomas Alexander Harrison, (1853–1930), American, 1880
- Paul Peel, (1860–1892), Canadian, 1881
- Henry Rodman Kenyon, (1861–1926), American, 1885, 1886 and 1888
- Arthur Wesley Dow, (1857–1922), American, 1885
- Paul Gauguin (1848–1903), French, 1886, 1888, 1889–1890 and 1894
- Émile Bernard (1868–1941), French, 1886, 1888 and 1891–1893
- Hubert Vos (1855–1935), Dutch, 1886
- Charles Laval (1862–1894), French, 1886
- Emile Schuffenecker (1851–1934), French, 1886
- Ferdinand du Puigaudeau (1864–1930), French, 1886
- Ernest de Chamaillard (1862–1930), French, 1888
- Meijer de Haan (1852–1895), Dutch, 1888
- Władysław Ślewiński (1854–1918), Polish, 1889
- Paul Sérusier (1864–1927), French, 1888, 1889 (and 1889, 1890)
- Armand Séguin (1869–1903), French, 1891–1893
- Charles Filiger (1863–1928), French, from 1888
- Jan Verkade (1868–1946), Dutch, 1891, 1892
- Mogens Ballin (1871–1914), Danish, 1891, 1892
- Henry Moret (1856–1913), French, from 1888
- Ernest Ponthier de Chamaillard (1862–1930), French, from 1888
- Gustave Loiseau (1865–1935), French, 1890
- Émile Jourdan (1860–1931), French, from 1888
- Jens Ferdinand Willumsen (1863–1958), Danish, 1890
- Roderic O'Conor (1860–1940), Irish, 1892
- Maurice Denis (1870–1943), French
- Paul-Émile Colin (1867–1949), French
- Robert Polhill Bevan, English, 1890, 1891, 1892, 1893 and 1894
- Cuno Amiet (1868–1961), Swiss, 1892
- Fredrich E. Wallace

== See also ==
- Musée des Beaux-Arts de Pont-Aven
