= Musée des Beaux-Arts de Pont-Aven =

Museum in France

Coordinates: 47°51′19″N 3°44′48″W

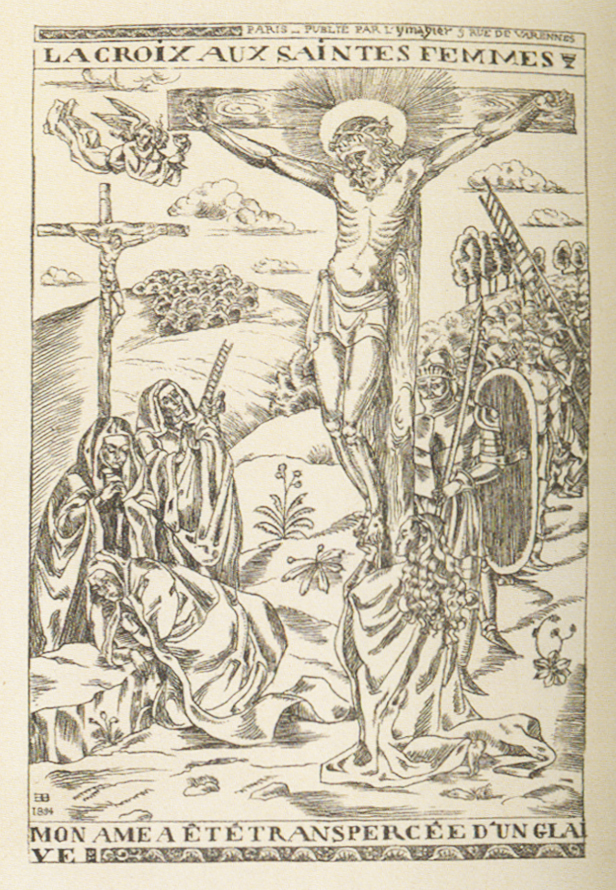
Émile Bernard: La croix aux saintes femmes, 1894

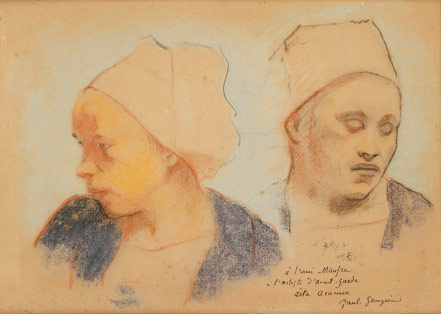
Gauguin: Deux têtes, 1894

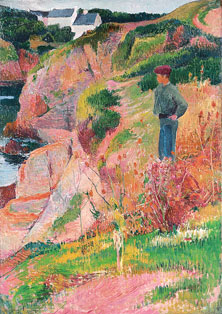
Henry Moret: Falaises en Bretagne, 1898

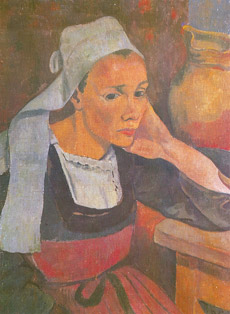
Sérusier: Portrait Marie Lagadu, 1889

The Musée des Beaux Arts de Pont-Aven also known as Museum of Pont-Aven was created in 1985 with the support of the French Museum Department and the Finistère Conseil Général. The modern wing built in 1985 is reserved for exhibitions and the old wing, which was renovated in 1987, houses a historical reconstruction of Pont-Aven at the end of the 19th century as well as the permanent collection dedicated to the Pont-Aven School.

== History ==
Some key dates marking the genesis of the museum

- August 1939. First revival of interest in the artistic past of the city: the mayor of Pont-Aven unveils a commemorative plaque on the former Pension Gloanec, recalling the many artists' productive stay (Émile Bernard, Charles Filiger, Paul Gauguin, Paul Sérusier ... ). Alongside this symbolic gesture, the salons of the Hôtel Julia host an exhibition on Gauguin and the Pont-Aven group.
- 1953. Fiftieth anniversary of the death of Paul Gauguin: a retrospective exhibition is held, featuring his painting La Belle Angèle, on special loan from the Louvre Museum, where it was then held.
- 1960. Creation of "The Friends of Gauguin" chaired by Maurice Malingue. Its mission is to publicize the Pont-Aven School through temporary exhibitions.
- 1971. The "Société de peintures de Pont-Aven", chaired by Bertrand Queinec, is successor to a body known as the "Association of the Friends of the 'Musée Paul-Gauguin'". In 1985, this becomes the "Association of the Friends of the Museum of Pont-Aven."
- Fall 1984. Building works for the museum begin.
- June 1, 1985. The Museum of Fine Arts in Pont-Aven opens.
- September 2012. Museum closes for building works.
- March 26, 2016. New museum with 18,000 square feet of working space opens to the public as the Musée de Pont-Aven in the restored and extended annex of the Hôtel Julia.

== Objectives ==
The objectives of the Museum

- To publicize the work of artists inspired by Brittany and especially by Pont-Aven, from the 1860s to the 1970s
- Develop a scientific work about this time period
- Open to the contemporary
- Guarantee of quality and professionalism of the work of the team, the Museum of Fine Arts in Pont-Aven now enjoys the title "Musée de France" issued by the Directorate of the Museums of France.

== Collection ==
Artists within the collection:

- Émile Bernard (1868–1941)
- Maurice Denis (1870–1943)
- Paul Gauguin (1848–1903)
- Meijer de Haan (1852–1895)
- Émile Jourdan (1860–1931)
- Maxime Maufra (1861–1918)
- Henry Moret (1856–1913)
- Paul Sérusier (1864–1927)
- Władysław Ślewiński (1854–1918)

== Management ==
- Curator: Estelle Guille des Buttes-Fresneau
- Assistant Curator and Head of Public Service: Camille Armandary
- Store Manager and Head of the Documentation Centre: Anne Bez-Le Tallec
- Secretary: Nathalie Floc'h

== See also ==
- List of museums in France
- Pont-Aven School
- Paroisse de Pont-Aven

== Bibliography ==
- Guille des Buttes-Fresneau, Estelle et al. (2016): The new Musée de Pont-Aven: A treasure-house for Gauguin and the Pont-Aven School, Éditions Faton, L'Objet d'art special issue
- Guille des Buttes-Fresneau, Estelle (3 November 2010): Pont-Aven Un Musée Une Collection, Paris: Somogy éditions d'art ISBN 978-2-75720-415-3
- Morane, Daniel (2000): Émile Bernard 1868–1941. Catalogue de l'œuvre gravé, Paris: Musée de Pont-Aven & Bibliothèque d'Art et d'Archéologie – Jacques Doucet ISBN 2-910128-20-2
