= Henry Bacon (painter) =

American painter (1839–1912)

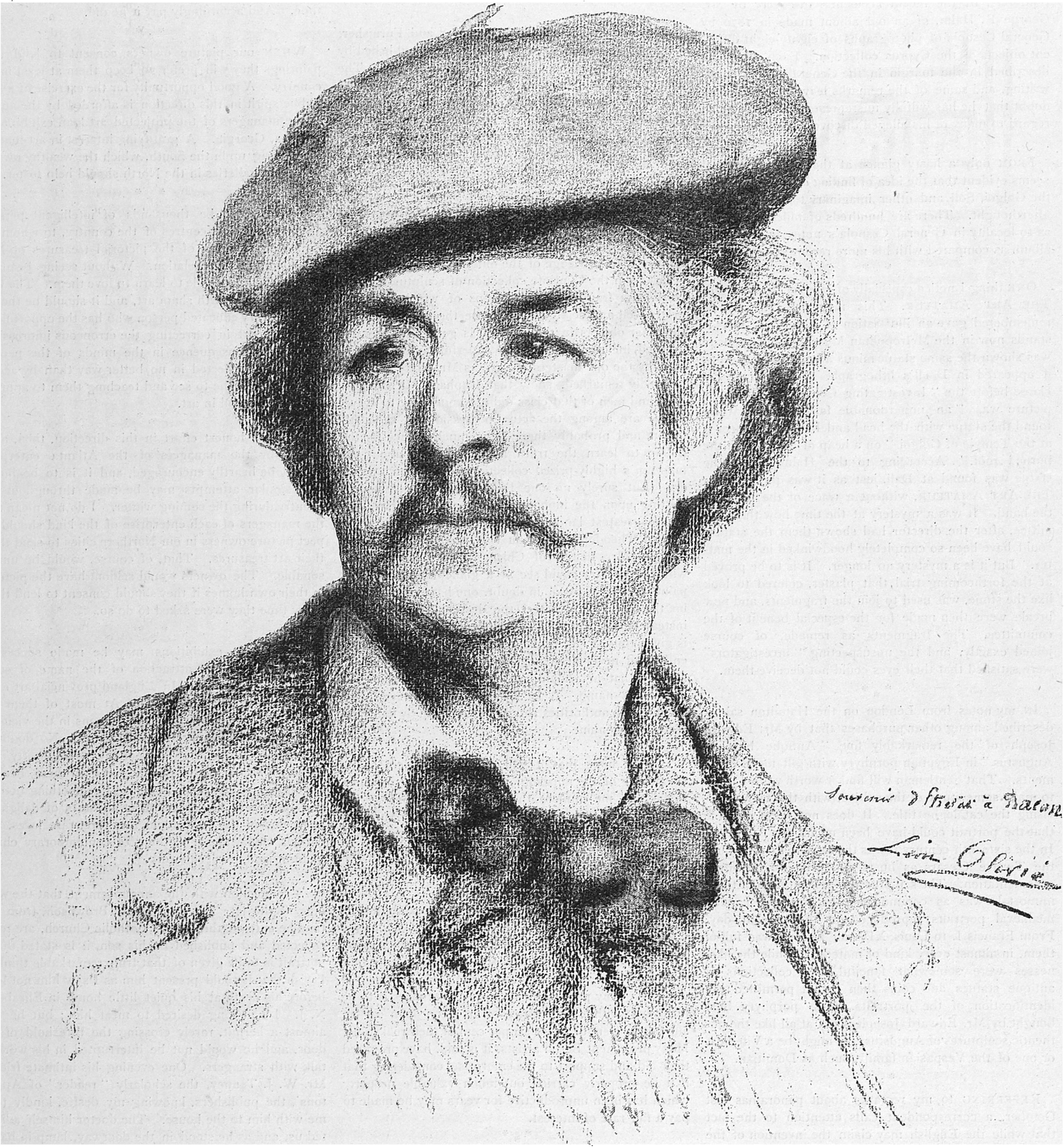
- Portrait, c. 1881
- Born: October 8, 1839; Haverhill, Massachusetts
- Died: March 13, 1912 (aged 72); Cairo, Sultanate of Egypt
- Education: Walter Gay; National School of Fine Arts, Paris
- Known for: Painting and illustration
- Movement: Orientalist

Signature
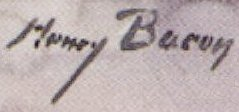

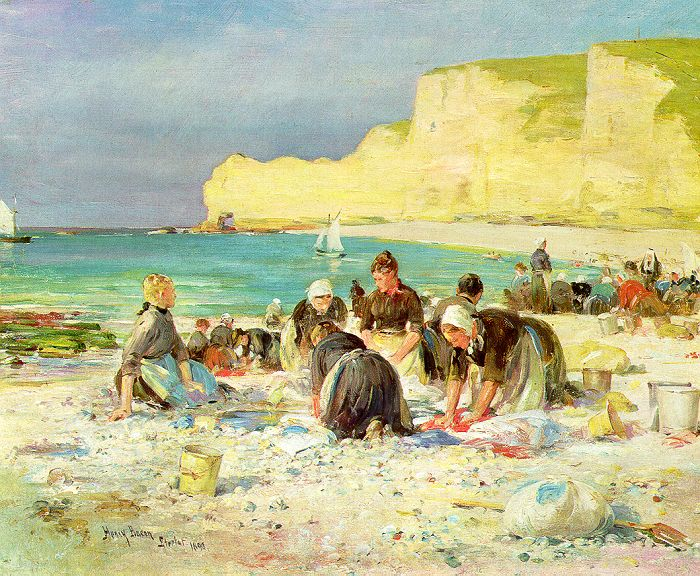
Henry Bacon's 1890 painting Étretat.

Henry Bacon (8 October 1839 – 13 March 1912) was an American painter, author, illustrator, and translator. Before his formal training as an artist, he served as a soldier and war artist during the American Civil War, and was badly wounded in the Second Battle of Bull Run. He then studied in France, and became a member of the Pont-Aven School, painting genre subjects of French country life, many sold back in America. He first traveled to Egypt in 1897, and then developed an interest in Orientalist painting, soon spending his winters in the Middle East, dying in Cairo.

== Life and career ==
Henry A. Bacon was born in Haverhill, Massachusetts in 1839. During the American Civil War, he enlisted in the Union Army on 16 July 1861 and acted as a field artist for Frank Leslie's Weekly while he served as a soldier within the 13th Massachusetts Infantry. Badly wounded at Bull Run, he was discharged on 19 December 1862.

After the war, he studied art with Walter Gay, who suggested that he travel to Paris to undertake a formal art education. In 1864, he went to Paris, with his first wife Elizabeth Lord, to study figure painting. He was admitted to France's premiere 'National School of Fine Arts' and was one of Alexandre Cabanel's pupils.

Bacon traveled to Pont-Aven, a commune/village in the Finistère département, in Brittany and fell in love with Pont-Aven. Back in Paris, he mentioned the place to his friends who were painters. He is credited to have been the first American painter and among the first painters from a long group of painters to come to Pont-Aven including Paul Gauguin and advised and attracted fellow American, Robert Wylie to spend summers there (and Wylie is even buried in Pont-Aven). This period is known nowadays as the Pont-Aven School.

Bacon exhibited at the salon from 1868 through to 1896 with genre works which had found favour with the American market.

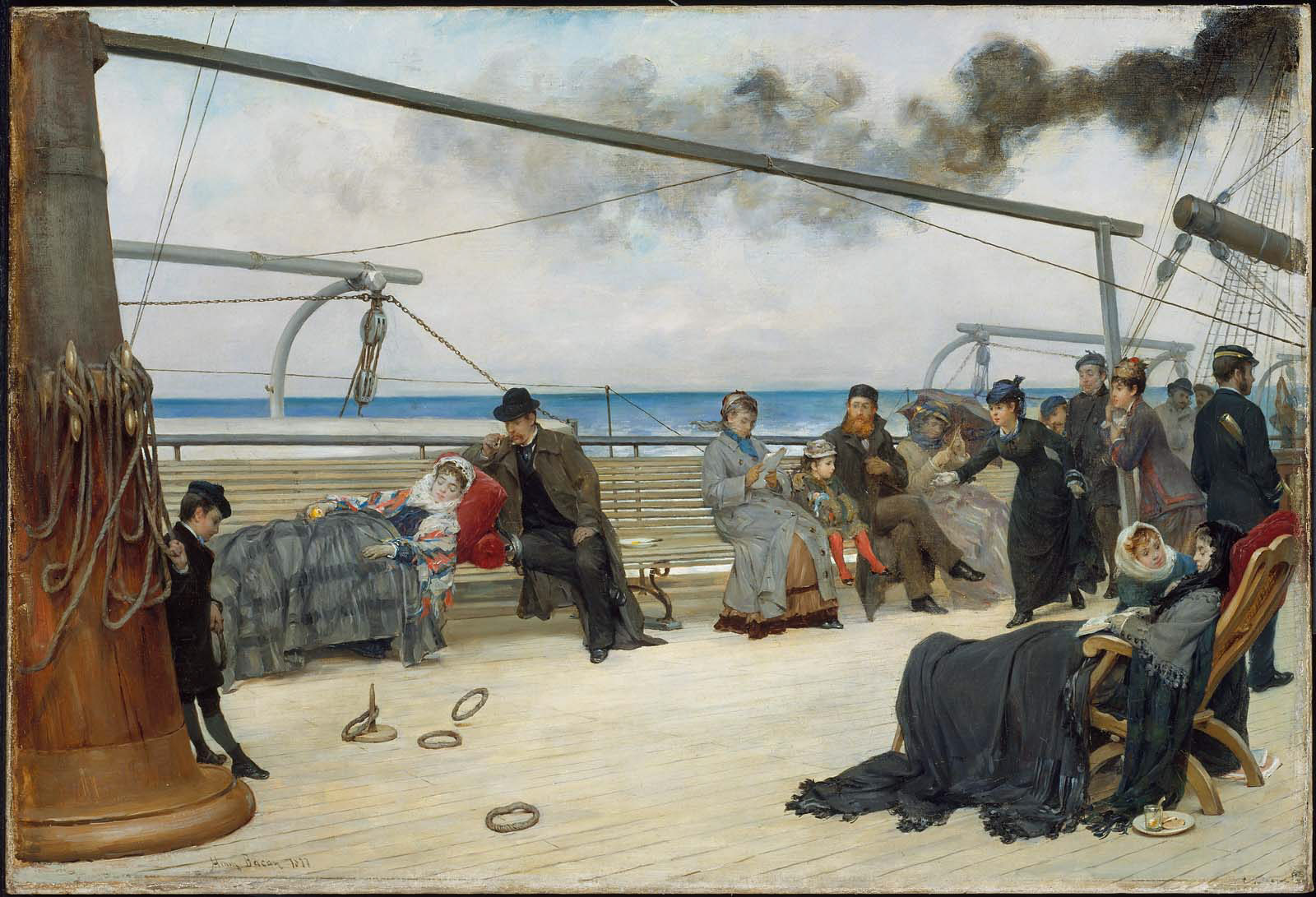
Henry Bacon -On the Open Sea -The Transatlantic Steamship "Péreire" - Accession #13.1692 Museum of Fine Arts Boston

He also worked as a journalist sending reports of events in Paris to the Boston Daily Evening Transcript. In 1897, he travelled to Egypt for the first time and began regularly spending winters there. At that time, he switched from oils to watercolours which he believed was the optimal medium to capture the transparent light of the Middle East.

Bacon was the author of A Parisian Year (1882), which he also illustrated, and Parisian Art and Artists (1883). He contributed illustrations to Our Houseboat on the Nile (1901) by Lee Bacon. From 1890 to 1898, he translated from the French annual volumes about the Paris Salon with illustrations by Goupil & Cie.

Bacon died of a heart attack in Cairo, Egypt, in 1912.

== Gallery ==
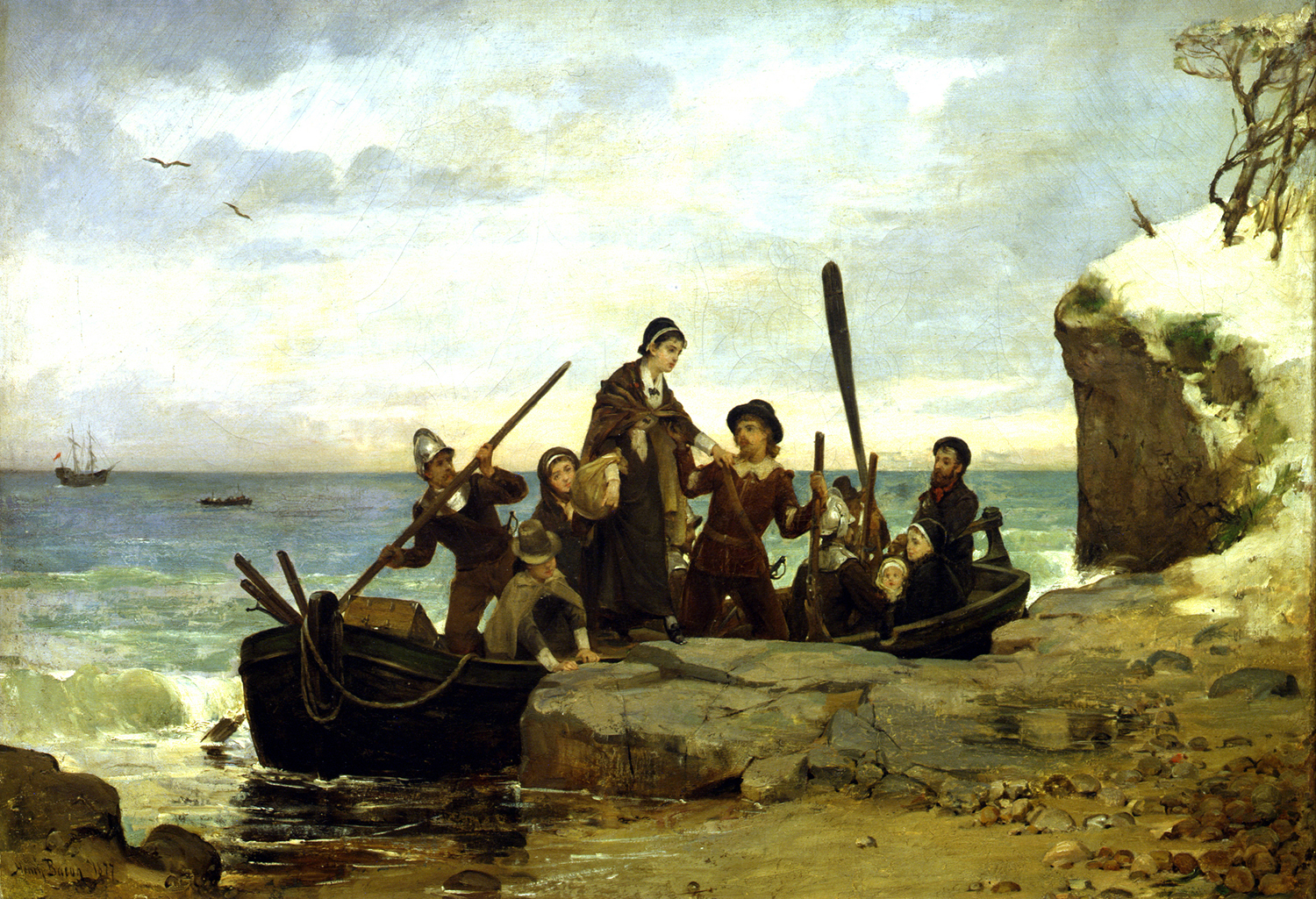
The Landing of the Pilgrims, 1877, Pilgrim Hall Museum

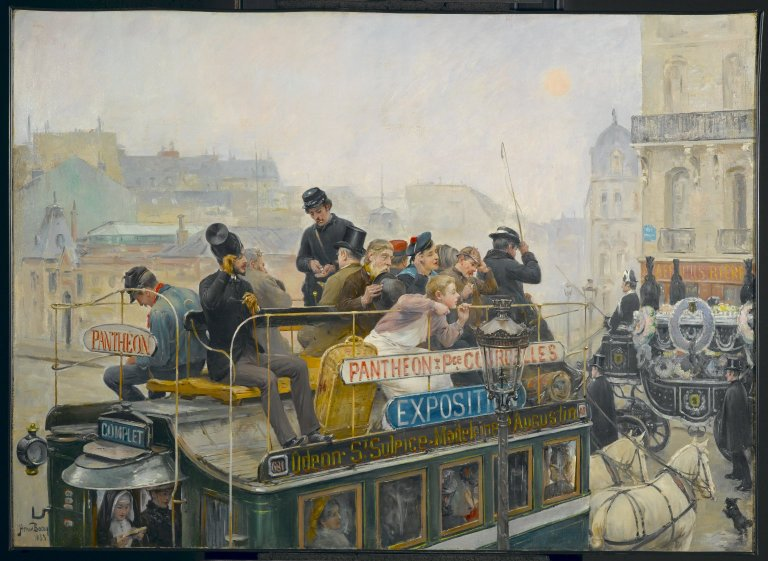
Égalité, 1889, Brooklyn Museum

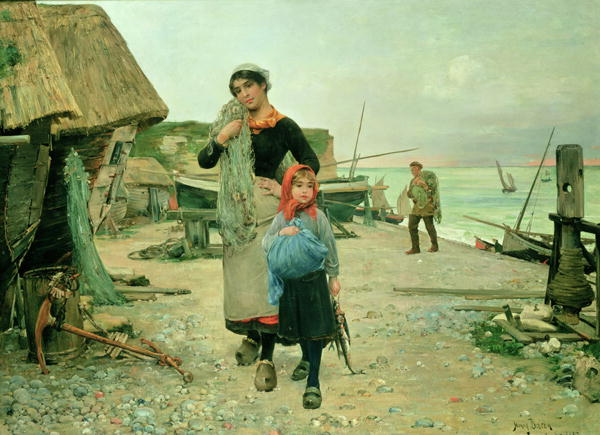
Fisherfolk Returning with their Nets, Etretat, c. 1890.

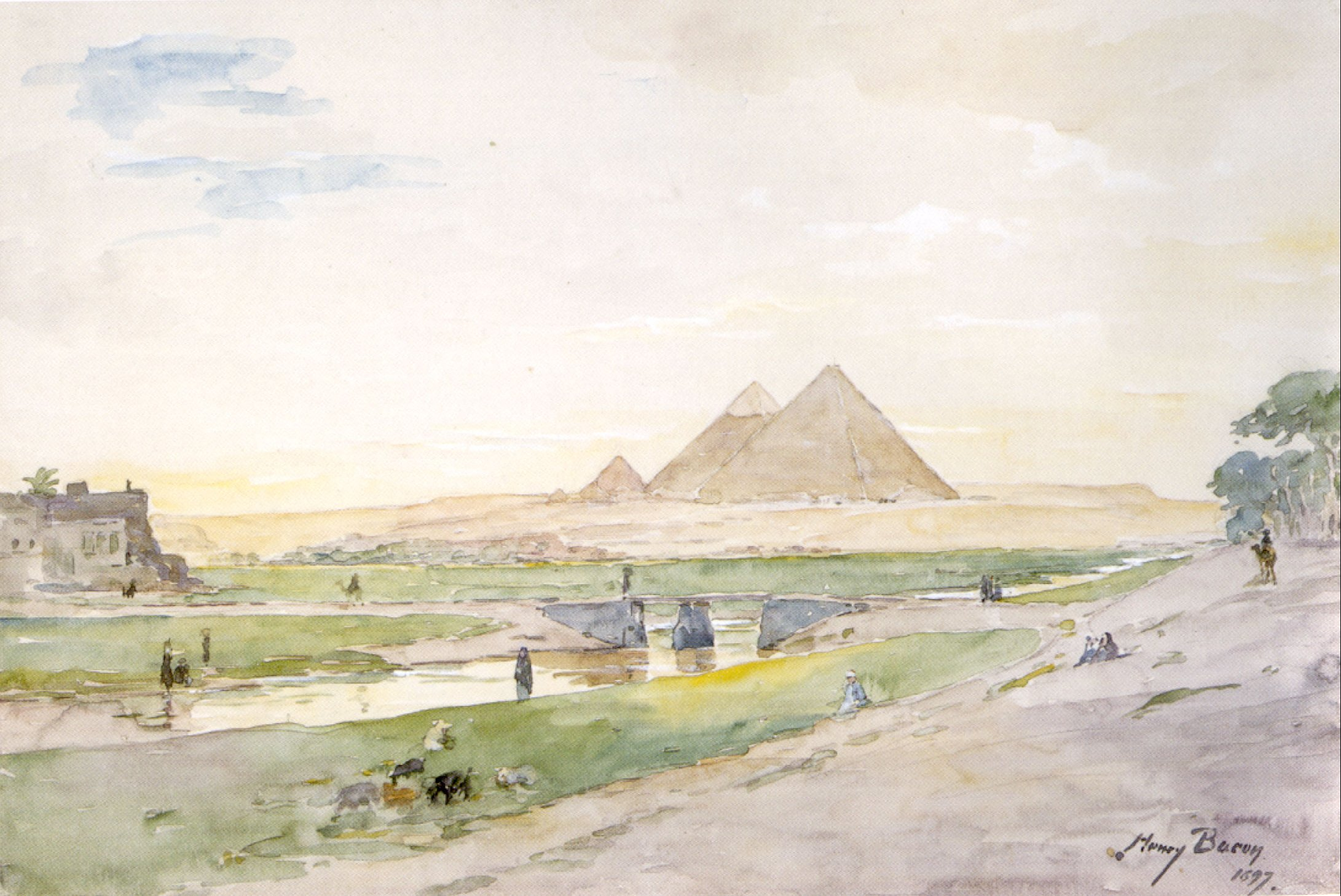
Egyptian Pyramids, watercolor over graphite, 1897, Honolulu Museum of Art

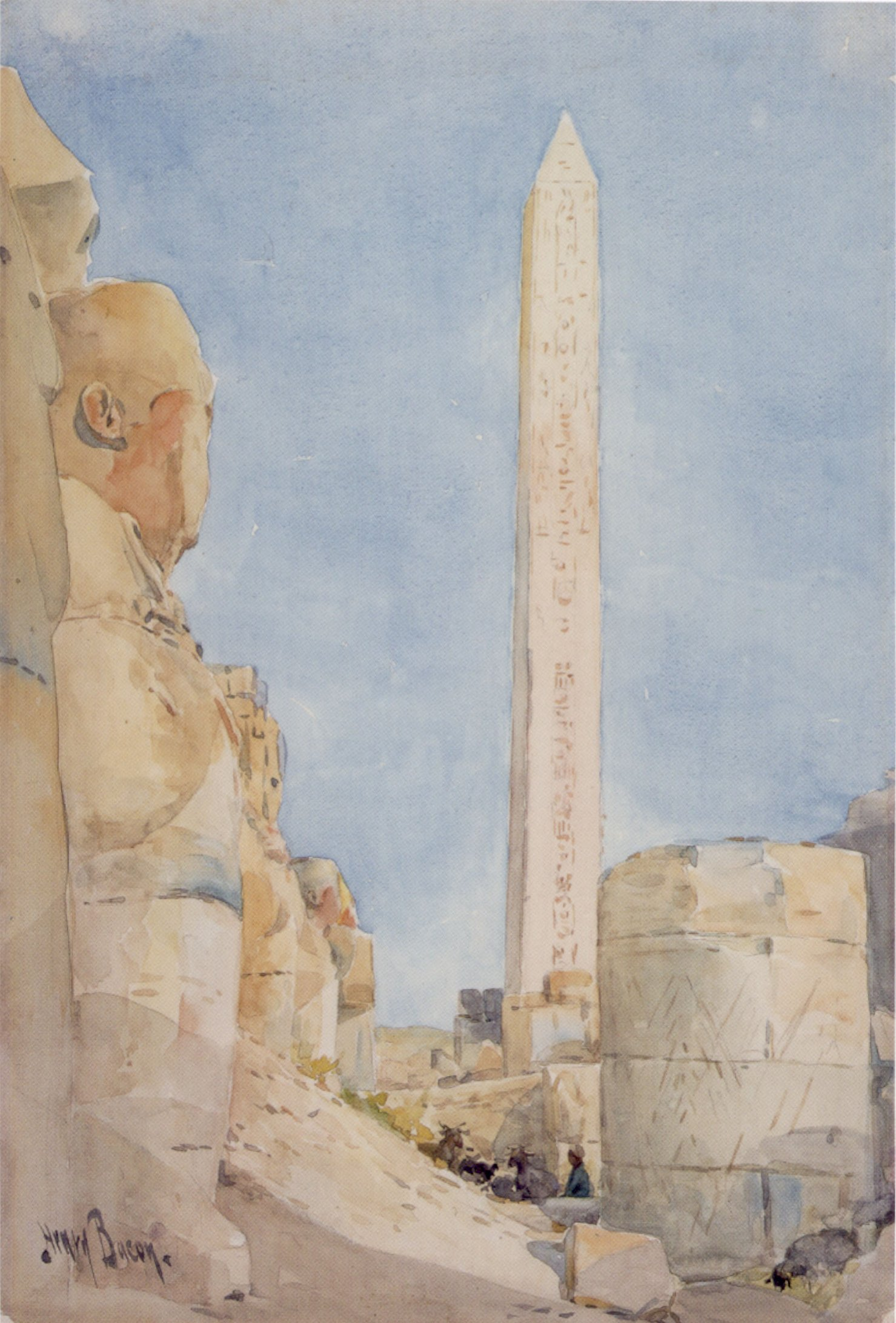
Obelisk-Karnak in 1900, watercolor over graphite, Honolulu Museum of Art

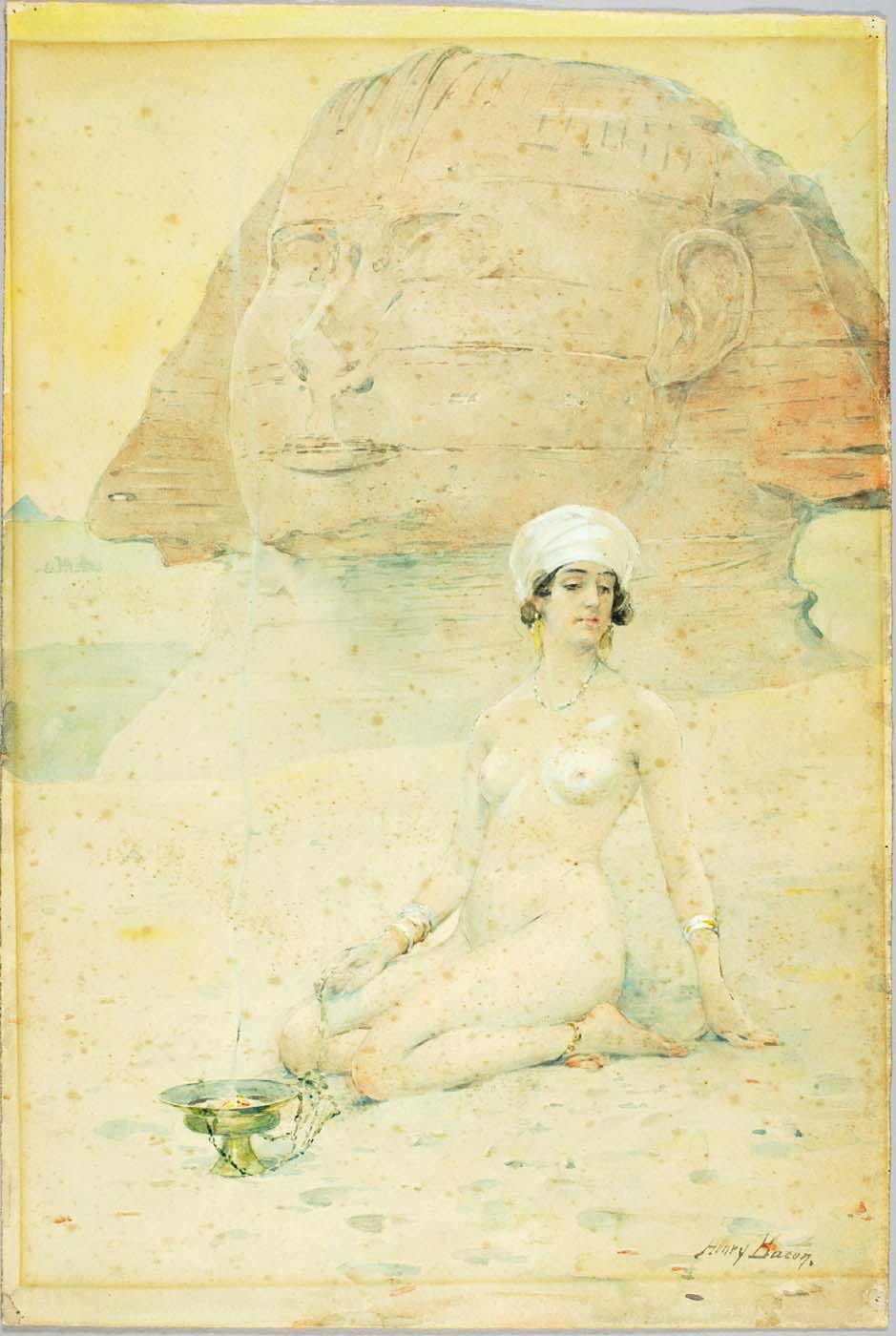
The Spirit of the Sphinx, c. 1900, Smithsonian American Art Museum

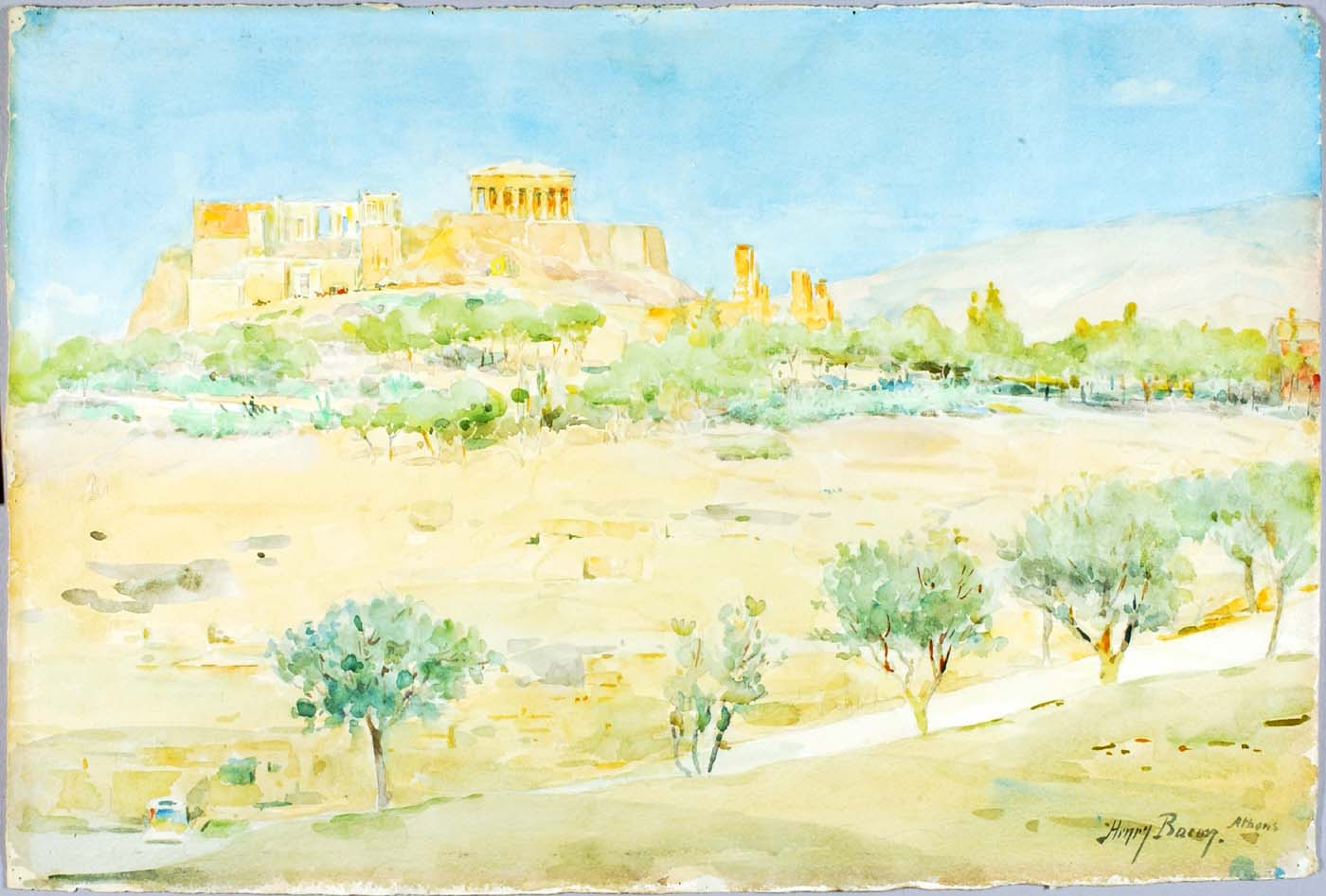
General View of the Acropolis at Sunset, n.d. Smithsonian American Art Museum

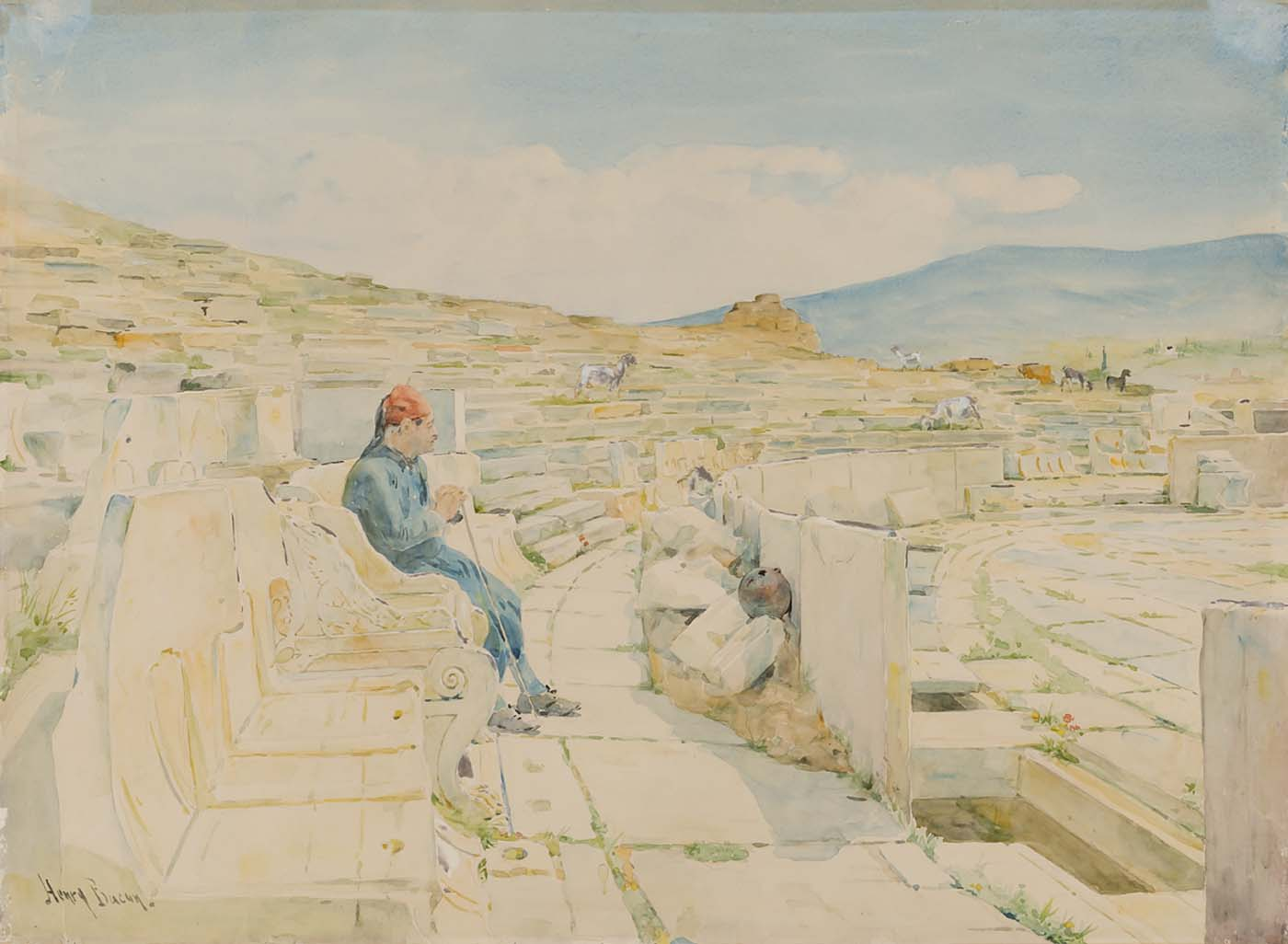
Theatre of Dionysus, n.d., Smithsonian American Art Museum

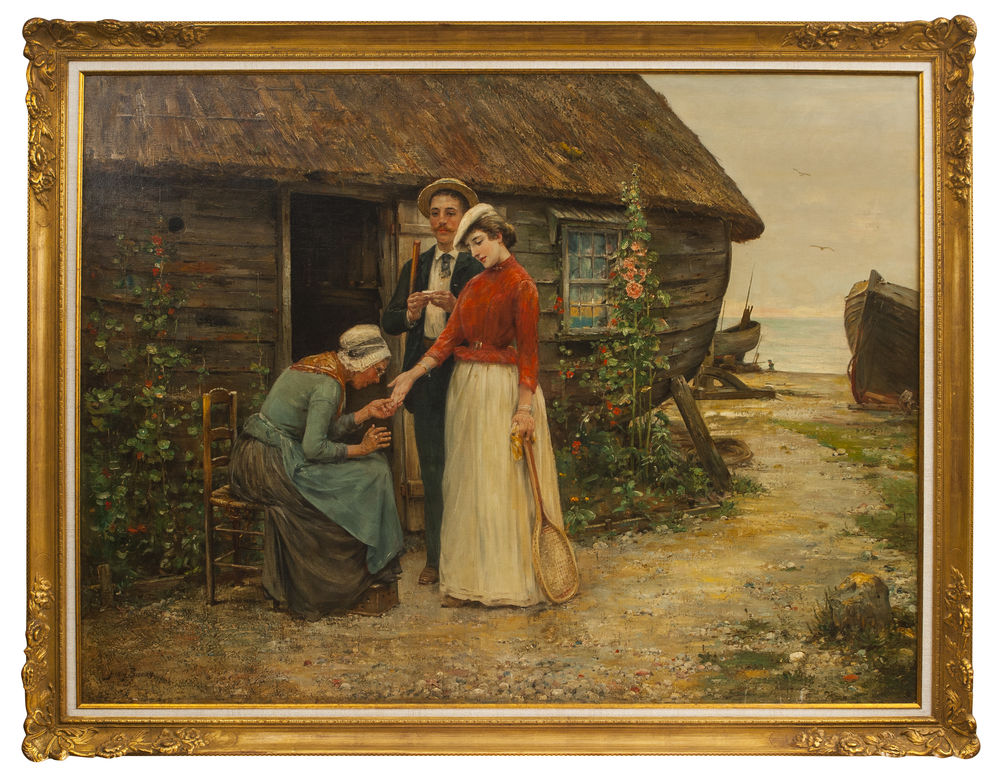
Fortuneteller, oil on canvas, 1888, Private collection

== Bibliography ==
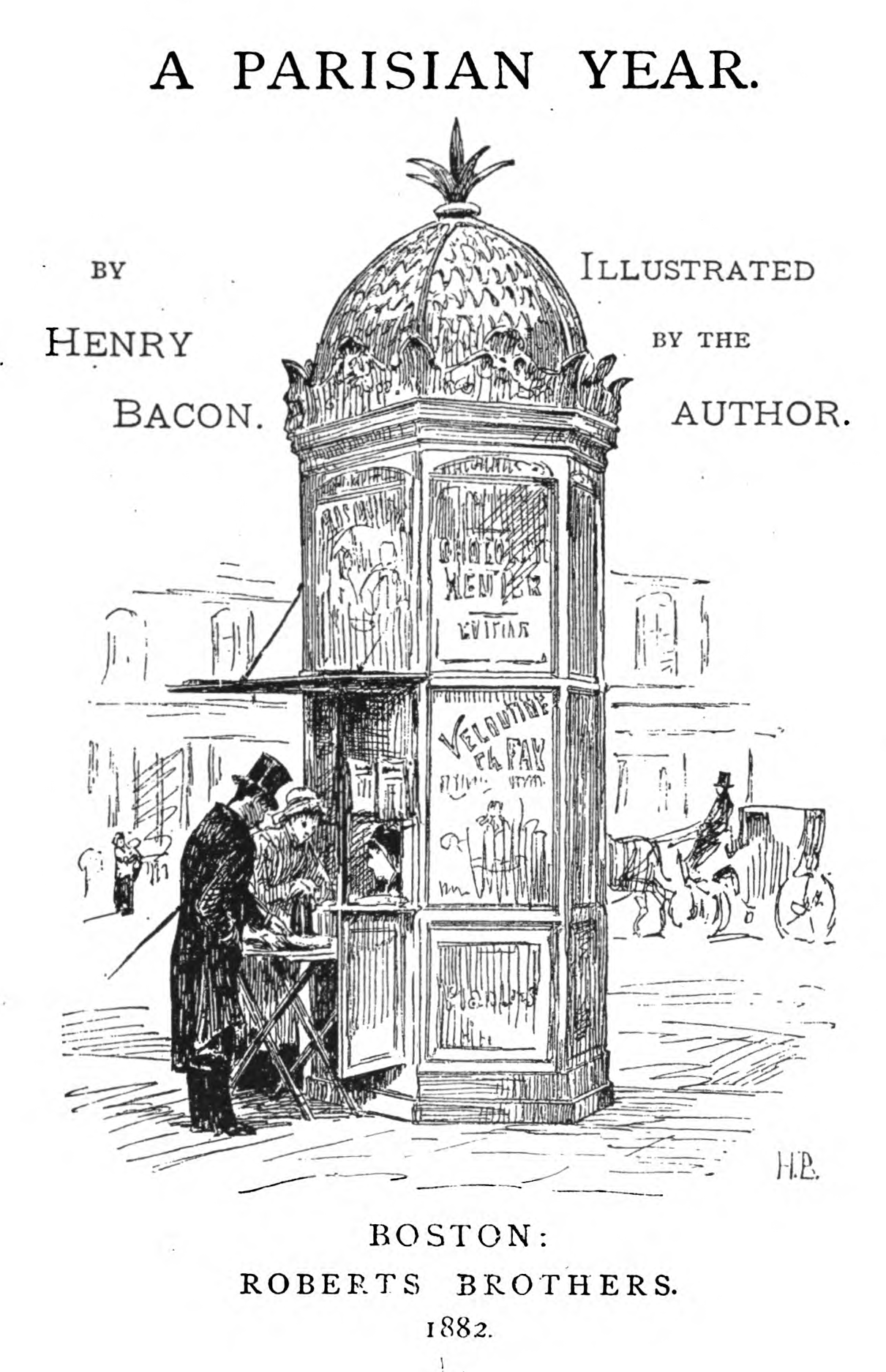
A Parisian Year, title page.

A bibliography of books written by, illustrated by, or translated by Henry Bacon:

=== Author ===
- Bacon, Henry (1882). A Parisian Year, illustrated by the author, Boston: Roberts Brothers, 1882.
- Bacon, Henry (1883). Parisian Art and Artists, Boston: J.R. Osgood and Company, 1883.

=== Illustrator ===
- Bacon, Lee (1901). Our Houseboat on the Nile, with illustrations from water colors by Henry Bacon, Boston: Houghton, Mifflin and Company, 1901.

=== Translator (chronological) ===
- Dayot, Armand (1890). The Salon of 1890, with text in English, translated by Henry Bacon, Boston: Estes & Lauriat, 1890.
- Proust, Antonin (1891). The Salon of 1891 with text in English, translated by Henry Bacon, Boston: Estes & Lauriat, 1891.
- Larroumet, Gustave (1892). The Salon of 1892, with text in English, translated by Henry Bacon. New York: Boussad, Valadon & Co., 1892.
- Jollivet, Gaston (1893). Goupil's Paris Salon 1893 with text in English, translated by Henry Bacon. New York: Boussad, Valadon & Co., 1893.
- Milès, Roger (1894). Goupil's Paris Salon of 1894 with text in English, translated by Henry Bacon, New York: Boussad, Valadon & Co., 1894.
- Bénédite, Léonce (1895). Goupil's Paris Salon of 1895 with text in English, translated by Henry Bacon, New York: Boussod, Valadon & Co., 1895.
- Thiébault-Sisson (1896). Goupil's Paris Salon of 1896 with text in English, translated by Henry Bacon, New York: Jean Boussad, Mansi, Jouant & Co., 1896.
- Schefer, Gaston (1897). Goupil's Paris Salon of 1897 with text in English, translated by Henry Bacon, New York: Jean Boussad, Mansi, Jouant & Co., 1897.
- Proust, Antonin (1898). Goupil's Paris Salon of 1898 with text in English, translated by Henry Bacon, New York: Jean Boussad, Mansi, Jouant & Co., 1898.

== Sources ==
- "13th Massachusetts Volunteer Infantry Rooster 1861-1864". Three Years in the Army, Charles E. Davis Jr., Boston 1894. Archived from the original on 21 September 2004.
- Ackerman, Gerald M. (1994). American Orientalists. ACR Édition. pp. 14–15. ISBN 978-2-86770-078-1.
- "Henry Bacon Dies in Egypt. American Water Color Painter Noted for His Normandy Scenes". The New York Times. March 14, 1912.
