= Émile Jourdan =

French painter (1860–1931)

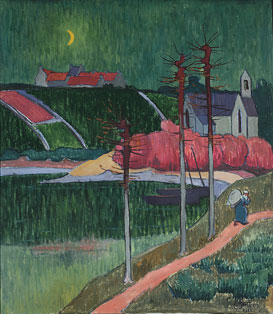
The Chapel of Lanriot by Moonlight

Émile Jourdan (30 July 1860, in Vannes – 29 December 1931, in Quimperlé) was a French painter who became one of the artists who gathered in the village of Pont-Aven in Brittany.

== Early life ==
Son of Prosper Jourdan, a ranking customs officer, and his wife Aline Paturel, he enjoyed a happy childhood in Vannes in the south of Brittany. He started painting at the age of 16. In 1880, he attended the École des Beaux-Arts in Paris where he was instructed by William Bouguereau and Tony Robert-Fleury until 1886. He also went on to study at the Académie Julian. Benefitting from the money he received from his parents, he shared a large studio with fellow student Édouard Michelin.

== Life in Pont-Aven ==
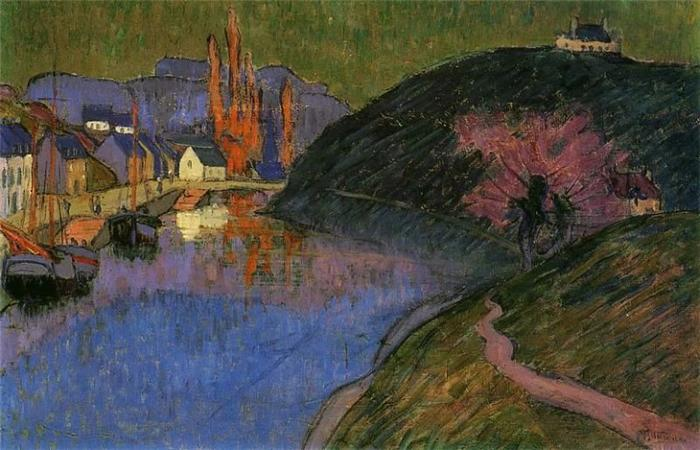
Le port de Pont-Aven (1891)

In the summer of 1886, he arrived in Pont-Aven where, staying at the Pension Gloanec, he met Paul Gauguin. He also became of friend of the other artists who had gathered there including Émile Bernard, Ernest de Chamaillard, Charles Laval and Henry Moret. He decided to settle in Pont-Aven and lived there until he died in 1931. Influenced by Gauguin, he adopted the Synthetist style of painting and became known as le peintre de la lumière, the painter of light.

In 1891, he joined Gauguin and his friends at the Lézaven atelier. He became acquainted with Maxime Maufra at the Hôtel de Bretagne in Pont-Aven where he started a romance with Catherine Guyader, a 19-year-old waitress. In 1892, they set up house together and the following year their son Yann was born to be followed by a daughter, Renée, in 1896, and a second son, Guy, in 1901.

After his mother died in 1907, he quickly spent all she left him. Unable to pay his rent, the proprietor expelled him and auctioned off his furniture and paintings. Thereafter he became a pauper, moving between Pont-Aven, Riec-sur-Belon and Moëlan where he was fortunate enough to be supported for a while by friends. After 1910, his paintings became more somber, reflecting his anxiety.

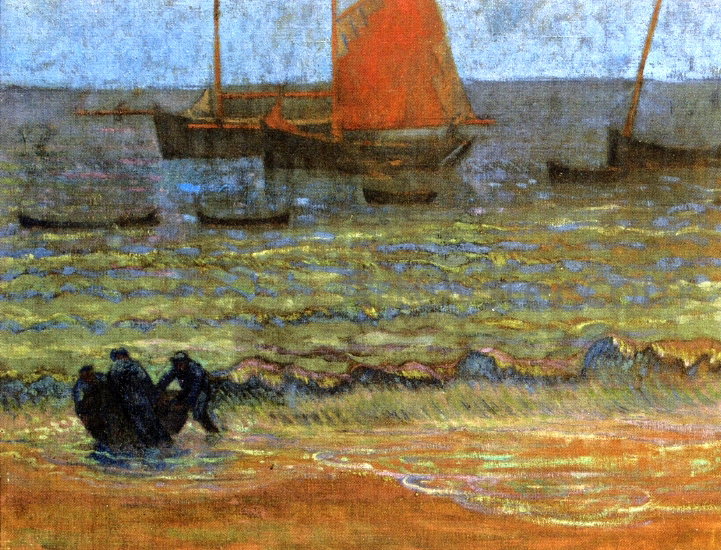
Marine View at Twilight

He was soon unable to support his family who left him while he lived in an attic in Pont-Aven. In 1927, he was lucky enough to meet a Mrs. Halley, a rich Australian, who supported him for a year but as he was unwilling to work under her orders, she discontinued her assistance.

In 1931, he died in the hospice at Quimperlé, an alcoholic crippled by poverty.

== Bibliography ==
- Collectif, Émile Jourdan (1860–1931), éd. Le Télégramme avec la collaboration du Musée de Pont-Aven, Collection: Petite Encyclopédie des Peintres de Bretagne , 32 p. ISBN 978-2-914552-01-1,
- Denise Delouche (ed), Pont-Aven et ses peintres. A propos d'un centenaire, Rennes, Presses Universitaires, 1986 (collection Arts de l'Ouest) 287 p.
