= Otto Weber (painter) =

German painter

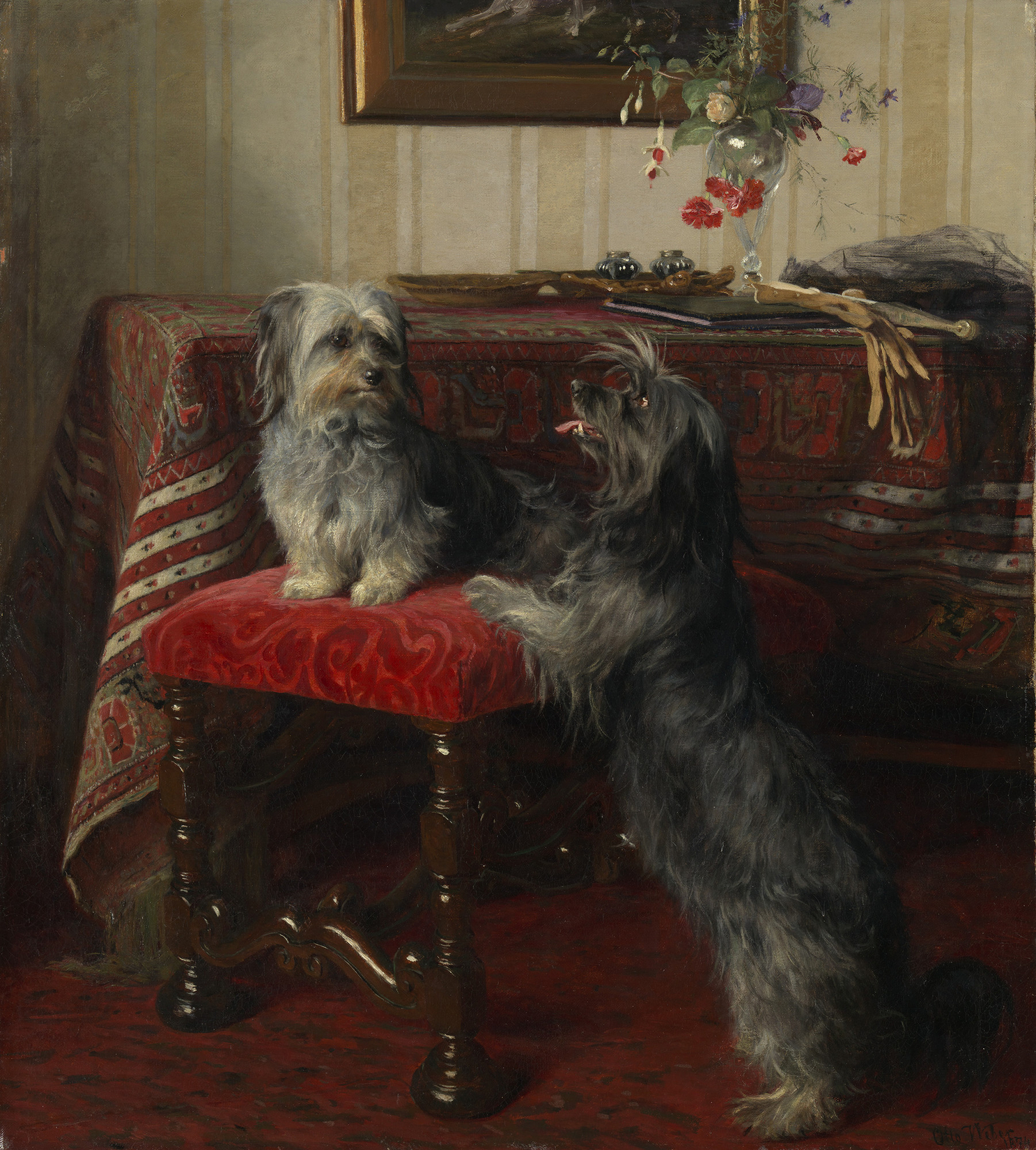
Queen Victoria's Skye Terriers, Dot and Cairnach

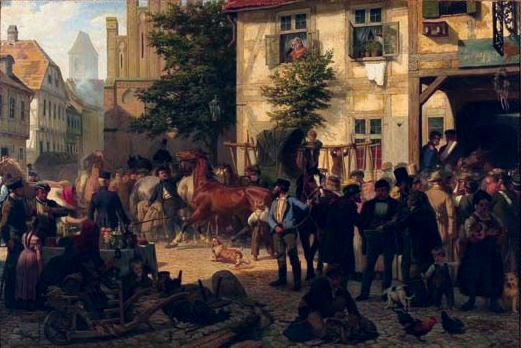
The Horse Market

Carl Emil Otto Weber (17 October 1832, in Berlin – 23 December 1888, in London) was a German genre, landscape, and animal painter. He was one of the first to paint in the Breton village of Pont-Aven which later developed into an artists' colony.

== Biography ==
His father, Wilhelm Weber was a merchant. He studied at the Prussian Academy of Arts with Carl Steffeck, then in Paris with Thomas Couture. In 1863–64, he travelled to Brittany where he painted genre works giving a romantic view of day-to-day life.

In 1864, he exhibited his first painting at the Paris Salon: "Noce à Pont-Aven". It was the first painting known to be inspired by the village of Pont-Aven, which subsequently became famous for its colony of artists and gave rise to the Pont-Aven School. He continued to exhibit at the Paris Salon until 1869, and was awarded two medals. His "La curée du chevreuil" (1868) is now in the Musée d'Orsay.

As a result of the Franco-Prussian War in 1870, he had to leave France, travelling to Italy where he spent a year in Rome. In 1872, he moved to London at the request of Queen Victoria, where he exhibited annually at the Royal Academy after 1874, and received commissions from the Queen. He would remain there for the rest of his life. He was a member of the Royal Watercolour Society and the Royal Institute of Oil Painters.
