= Gustave Loiseau =

French painter

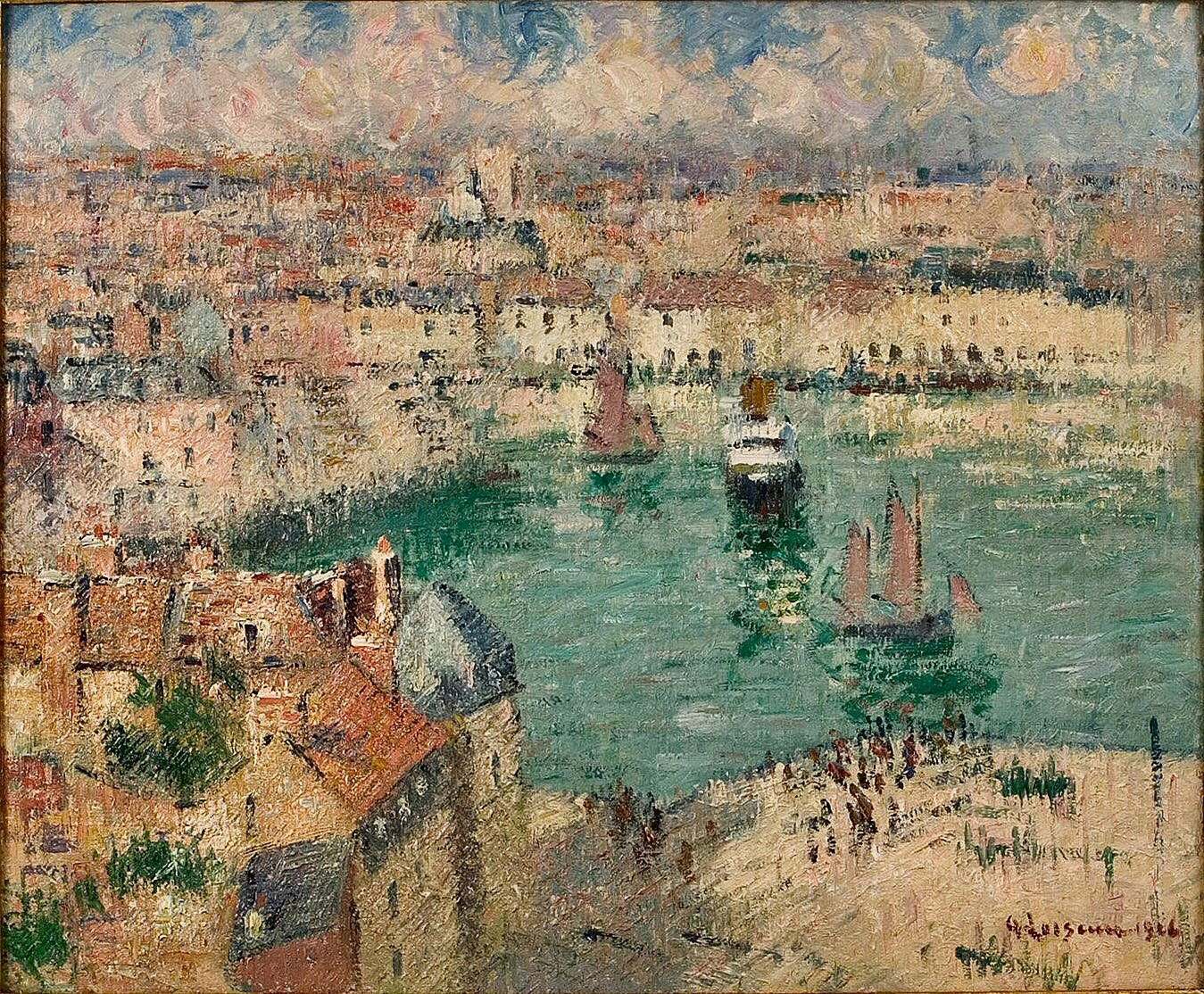
Gustave Loiseau: Port de Dieppe (1926)

Gustave Loiseau (3 October 1865 – 10 October 1935) was a French Post-Impressionist painter, remembered above all for his landscapes and scenes of Paris streets.

== Early life ==
Loiseau was born in Paris and was brought up there, and at Pontoise, by parents who owned a butchers shop. He served an apprenticeship with a decorator who was a friend of the family. In 1887, when a legacy from his grandmother allowed him to concentrate on painting, he enrolled at the École des arts décoratifs where he studied life-drawing. However, a year later he left the school after an argument with his teacher.

== Career ==
While working as a decorator, Loiseau redecorated the apartment of the landscape painter Fernand Quignon (1854–1941). After he left the École des arts décoratifs, he invited Quignon to tutor him in painting. In 1890, he went to Pont-Aven in Brittany for the first time, fraternizing with the artists there, especially Paul Gauguin and Émile Bernard. After experimenting with Pointillism, he adopted his own approach to Post-Impressionism, painting landscapes directly from nature. His technique known as en treillis or cross-hatching gave his works a special quality, now recognized as his speciality.

Loiseau first exhibited at the Salon des Indépendants in 1893 and at the Salon de la Société Nationale in 1895 as well as at impressionist exhibitions in 1890 and 1896.

Loiseau died in Paris on 10 October 1935.

== Paintings ==
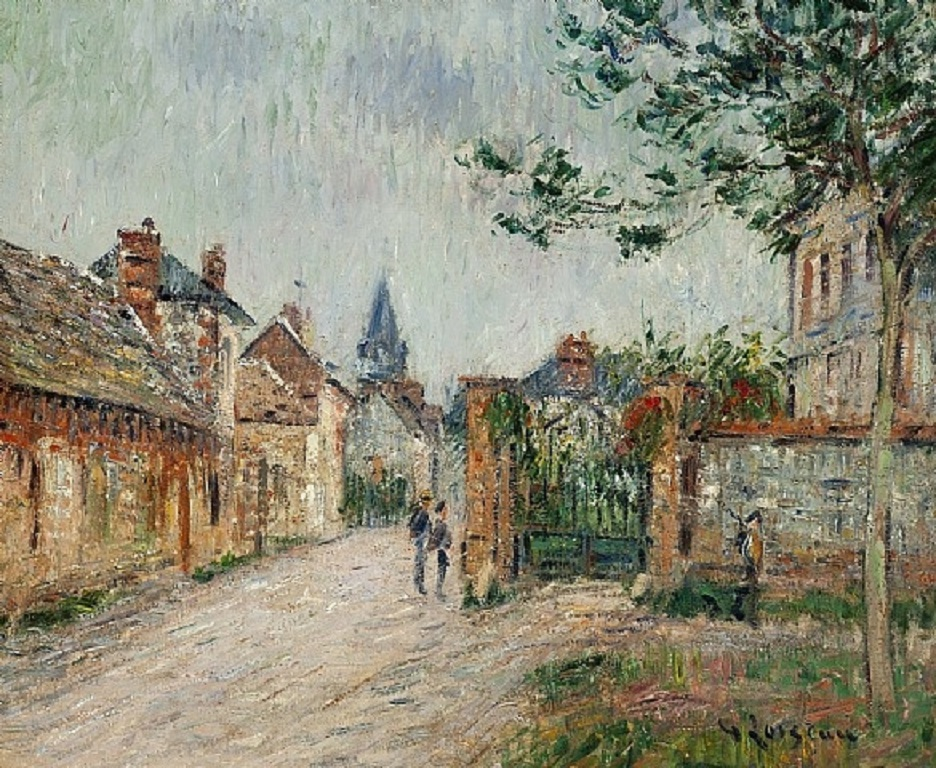
La rue de village, Saint-Cyr-du-Vaudreuil

Loiseau's paintings, revealing his passion for the seasons from the beginning of spring to the harvests later in the autumn, often depict the same orchard or garden scene as time goes by. Series of this kind, which also include cliffs, harbours or churches, are reminiscent of Claude Monet. Although Loiseau did not complete many portraits, he often painted people at work: dockers together with their boats, villagers leaving a Sunday service in Brittany or arriving at the market in Pont-Aven, or even carriages in Paris driving across the Place de la Bastille and the Étoile. He is also remembered for his paintings of Paris streets such as the Rue de Clignancourt or the Avenue de Fiedland. From the 1920s, he painted many still-lifes. His overall approach, rather than being associated with any particular theory, is simply an attempt to represent scenes as sincerely as possible.
