= Clement Nye Swift =

American painter

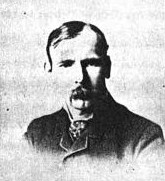
- Clement Nye Swift
- Born: 1846; Acushnet, Massachusetts
- Died: March 29, 1918 (aged 71–72)
- Resting place: Acushnet Cemetery, Acushnet, Massachusetts
- Education: École des Beaux-Arts
- Known for: Painting
- Movement: Pont-Aven School
- Spouse: Annie Amelia Swift

Clement Nye Swift (1846 – March 29, 1918) was an American artist associated with the Pont-Aven School and known for his paintings of nautical themes and of life in Brittany and Massachusetts.

== Biography ==
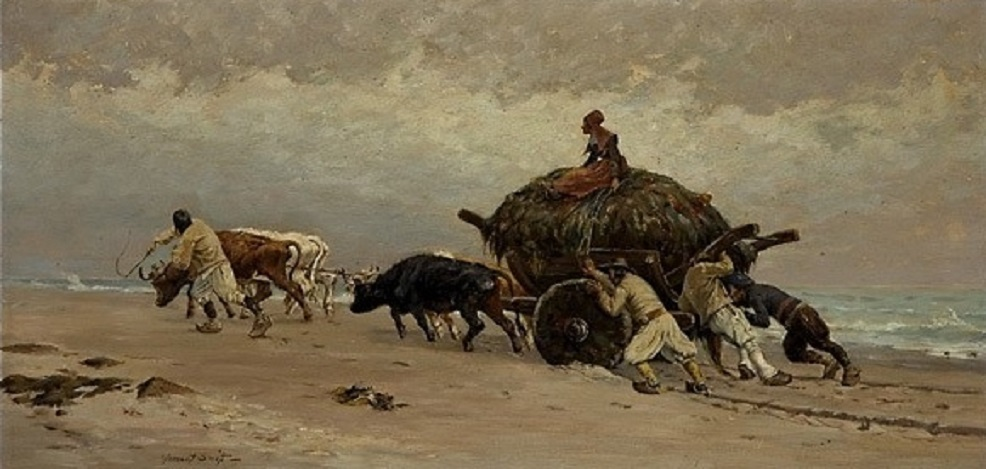
Seaweed Gatherers, Brittany

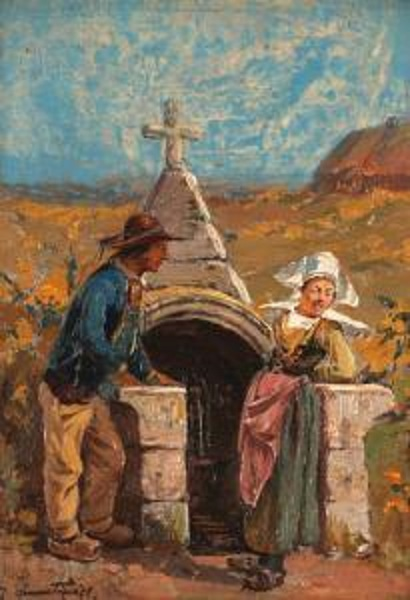
Flirtation at the Shrine

Swift was born in 1846 in Acushnet, Massachusetts, to Rhodolphus Nye Swift and Sylvia Hathaway. As a child, he attended the Friends Academy in Dartmouth, Massachusetts. His early interest was in painting animals, and he moved to France to study painting at the École des Beaux-Arts in Paris. He also studied with the artists Adolphe Yvon and Henri Harpignies.

After the outbreak of the Franco-Prussian War in 1870, he moved to Brittany. He settled in the coastal town of Pont-Aven, where he joined the artistic community known the Pont-Aven School. He lived there for ten years, and during this time he produced the majority of his paintings. Between 1872 and 1880, he exhibited his work at the Paris Salon.

In 1881, Swift returned to Acushnet, Massachusetts, where he took up writing, producing a series of stories and poems. He married his cousin Annie Amelia Swift on October 15, 1895. He died March 29, 1918, and is buried in Acushnet Cemetery.
