= Anna Lownes =

American painter (1842–1910)

- Born: December 19, 1842; Delaware County, Pennsylvania, U.S.
- Died: January 4, 1910 (aged 67)
- Education: Philadelphia School of Design for Women; Académie Delécluse
- Occupation: Painter
- Style: Still life

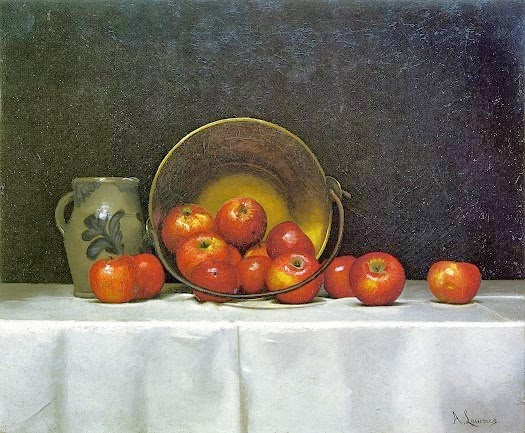
Study of Apples c. 1884–1889

Anna Lownes (December 19, 1842 – January 4, 1910), (active 1884–1905) was an American painter of still lifes.

She was born in Delaware County, Pennsylvania, to Phineas Lownes and Emily Lewis, a niece of manufacturer and philanthropist John Price Crozer. Lownes studied at the Philadelphia School of Design for Women and at the Académie Delécluse in Paris. She was a pupil of Milne Ramsey. She exhibited work at the Pennsylvania Academy of the Fine Arts and National Academy of Design; from 1885 to 1887 catalogs gave her address as Media, Pennsylvania, but in later years she was said to have moved to 1708 Chestnut Street, Philadelphia.

Lownes exhibited her work at the Palace of Fine Arts and The Woman's Building at the 1893 World's Columbian Exposition in Chicago, Illinois. A Study of Apples dated to before 1890 was included in the inaugural exhibition of the National Museum of Women in the Arts, American Women Artists 1830-1930, in 1987.
