= William Lamb Picknell =

American painter (1853–1897)

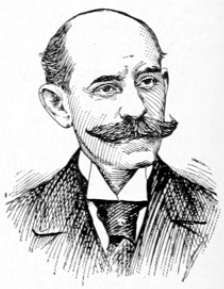
- 1904 posthumnous portrait of Picknell, in The Biographical Dictionary of America
- Born: October 23, 1853; Hinesburg, Vermont, US
- Died: August 8, 1897 (aged 43); Marblehead, Massachusetts, US
- Known for: Painting
- Movement: Academic

William Lamb Picknell (October 23, 1853 – August 8, 1897) was an American painter of landscapes, coastal views, and figure genres, known for his rapid painting style. He was born in Hinesburg, Vermont and died in Marblehead, Massachusetts.

== Life and career ==
Born in Hinesburg, Vermont, William was the son of Ellen Maria Upham and the Reverend William Lamb Picknell, a Baptist minister, both of New England families. William had a younger brother named George W. Picknell, who was born in 1864. In July 1868, the summer following his father's death, the Picknell family moved to Chelsea, Massachusetts.

He began his career by working in a frame shop while living with relatives in Boston, where he took lessons from George Loring Brown. In 1872, he travelled to Europe where he trained with George Inness in Rome (alongside the master's son and Douglas Volk) and Jean-Léon Gérôme in Paris (1874–75), and also received some informal training from Robert Wylie in Brittany. Inspired by the gardens and artist colonies at Pont-Aven and Concarneau, Picknell and friend Hugh Bolton Jones founded a similar botanical artist's colony called "Squam" at Annisquam, Massachusetts on the leeward side of Cape Ann. The colony was thriving in the 1890s with Emil Carlsen and Robert Vonnoh in residence.

Throughout the 1880s, he lived primarily in Waltham, Massachusetts, but frequently travelled abroad, spending two winters in England and also visiting other parts of the US, including Florida and California. He married Gertrude Powers in 1889 and the couple had one child. He was living at Moret-sur-Loing, on the edge of the Forest of Fontainebleau, for most of the 1890s, but often spent the winters in the south of France. He returned to Massachusetts in 1897 following the death of his only child. He died of heart failure in Marblehead on August 8, 1897.

A memorial exhibition of his life work was held the next year in the Museum of Fine Arts, Boston. In 1900, Fifth Avenue Art Galleries sold 60 of his paintings for a total of $16,595, approx. $620,000 in 2024. In 2006, his "Vue de Provence" sold at Sotheby's for $45,000, and other works routinely sell for over $20,000.

== Notable works ==
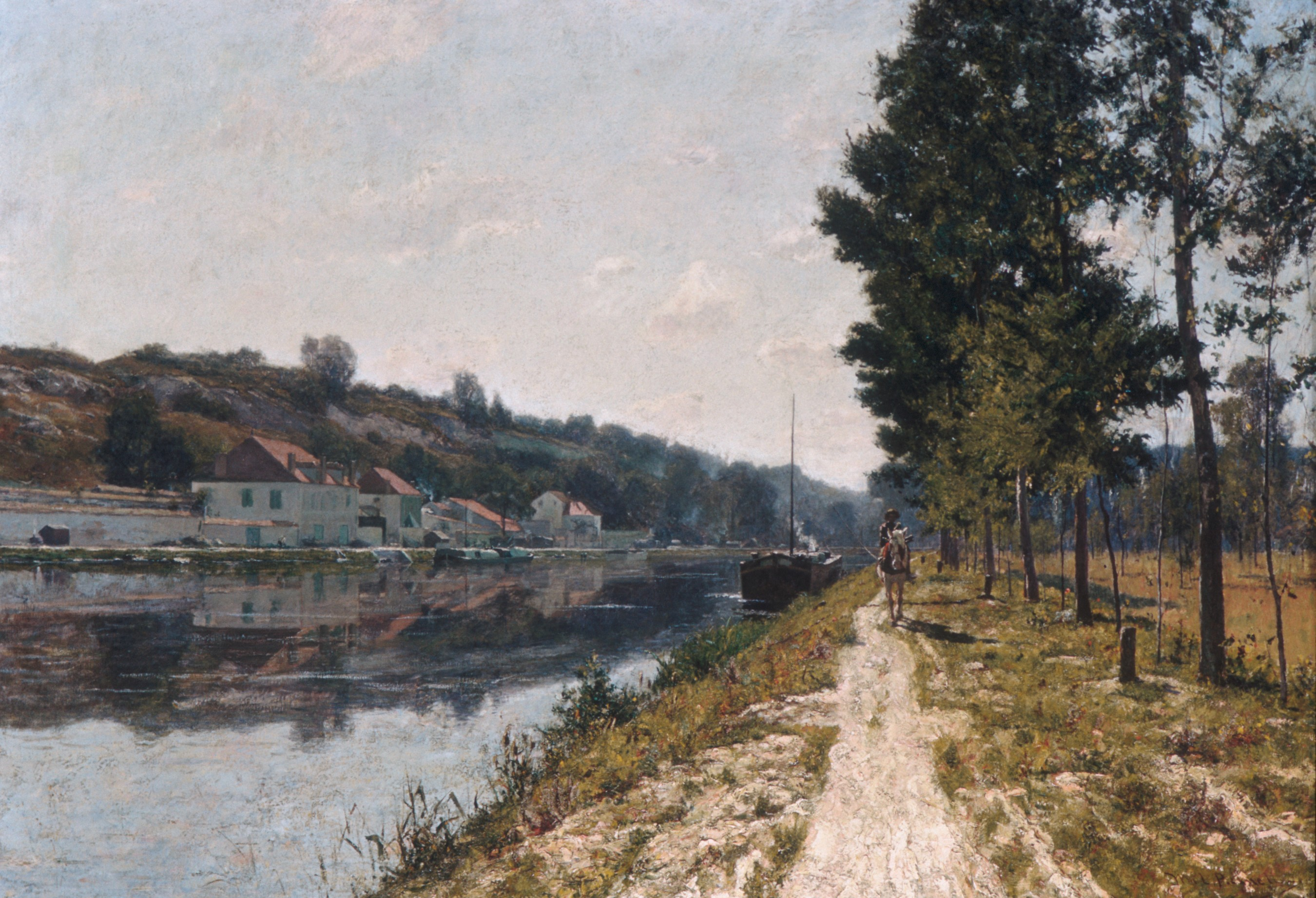
Banks of the Loing

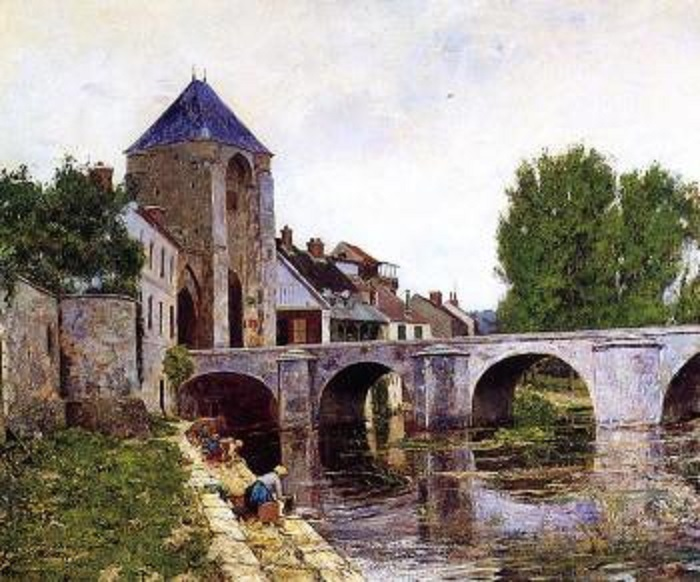
Jour gris [Grey day], 1895

- The Road to Concarneau 1880, Corcoran Gallery
- Lobster Fisherman 1882
- Lande de Kerran, Finistere 1877
- Morning on the Loing at Moret c. 1895, Museum of Fine Arts, Boston
- Banks of the Loing c. 1895 at the Metropolitan Museum of Art
- View 5 works at CGFA

== Honors ==
- Honorable Mention, Paris Salon, 1880 (The Road to Concarneau)
- Member, Society of American Artists
- Associate, National Academy of Design
- Member, Society of British Artists
