= Earl Shinn =

American journalist (1838–1886)

Earl Shinn (November 8, 1838 – November 3, 1886) was an American art critic and art historian who often wrote under the pseudonym "Edward Strahan."

== Early life and career ==
Shinn was born in Philadelphia, Pennsylvania, the youngest child of a middle-class Quaker family. After attending Westtown School, an orthodox Quaker school in Chester County, Pennsylvania, Shinn worked for several years as a conveyancer in Philadelphia. In 1859 he took his first step toward a career in art by enrolling in the Pennsylvania Academy of the Fine Arts to study drawing and painting. He remained at the academy until 1863 (presumably declining to serve in the Union army because of his religious beliefs). The following year, Shinn moved to New York City and worked as a staff writer for the weekly publication Frank Leslie's Illustrated Newspaper.

In April 1866, after having returned to Philadelphia as a result of his parents' deaths the summer before, Shinn, accompanied by his sculptor friend Howard Roberts, traveled to France with the goal of continuing his studies in drawing and painting at the École nationale supérieure des Beaux-Arts in Paris. When he arrived in Paris later that spring, the school had suspended its enrollment of foreign students. He and Roberts connected with Robert Wylie, a former curator at the Pennsylvania Academy of the Fine Arts living in Paris, who convinced the two of them to join him that summer in Pont-Aven, a village on the Breton coast that would later become a destination for Paul Gauguin and other Post-Impressionists. Despite expressing doubts about his abilities as a painter in a letter to his sister, Shinn resumed his efforts to gain admittance to the École des Beaux-Arts upon his return to Paris that fall and was finally successful, thanks, according to Shinn, to the persistent cajoling of government officials by Thomas Eakins, another young Philadelphia painter who overlapped with Shinn at the Pennsylvania Academy of the Fine Arts. Shinn studied at the Ecole for a little over one year in the atelier of Jean-Léon Gérôme, a well-regarded painter of classical and Oriental scenes. Shinn returned to Philadelphia in spring of 1868.

== As art critic ==
Shinn's doubts about his painting abilities never left him during his time in France. By the end of his studies at the Ecole, he had resolved that his would not be the life of a painter, thanks in large part, it seems, to his poor eyesight. He wrote to his sister in 1867, "Art I should like, and I have a vocation for it; but I think my near-sightedness, color-blindness and failing vision are pretty strong hints from nature that that career is not intended for me..." Already in summer of 1866, while he was in Pont-Aven, Shinn looked again to writing for newspapers and magazines. He wrote regular pieces about his experiences there for the Philadelphia Evening Bulletin and had two similar pieces published by the fledgling magazine The Nation. In 1869, in the United States again, Shinn wrote a series of articles about his experiences at the École des Beaux-Arts for The Nation, cementing his relationship with the magazine's founding editor, E.L. Godkin. By this time he was living in New York again, where he would principally reside until his death.

Shinn spent several months in Philadelphia in 1872 to write a series of ten articles for Lippincott's Magazine on private art collections of wealthy Philadelphians, the start of an increasingly all-consuming interest of his in private art collections. After returning to New York, he continued to contribute art criticism to The Nation and took the helm as art editor of the magazine from 1874 to 1879. From 1879 to 1884, Shinn contributed semi-regularly to the magazine The Art Amateur. He usually wrote anonymously or included his initials at the end of his articles. Shinn saw as the principal aim of art the instruction of the public and the elevation of public taste and often championed in his writing the public art institutions that were being established in the years following the American Civil War, such as the Metropolitan Museum of Art in New York and the Corcoran Gallery in Washington, D.C.

During the 1870s and 1880s, Shinn wrote a number of books on art (under the pseudonym "Edward Strahan"), including a catalogue of the art gallery at the 1876 Centennial Exhibition in Philadelphia and a retrospective of the work of his former instructor Jean-Léon Gérôme. His most famous works are the two multi-volume publications he wrote on the private art collections of wealthy Americans: The Art Treasures of America (published as a serial between 1879 and 1882) and Mr. Vanderbilt's House and Collection (published, again as a serial, between 1883 and 1884), in which he reviewed the art collection at William Henry Vanderbilt's New York mansion. Perhaps more than any other contemporary work, these two books shed light on the tastes and collecting habits of American art collectors in the Gilded Age.

Shinn was also a member of the Tile Club, a group of New York artists and writers whose membership included Winslow Homer, William Merritt Chase, and Augustus Saint-Gaudens. He wrote the first two chapters of A Book of the Tile Club before his death in New York in 1886.

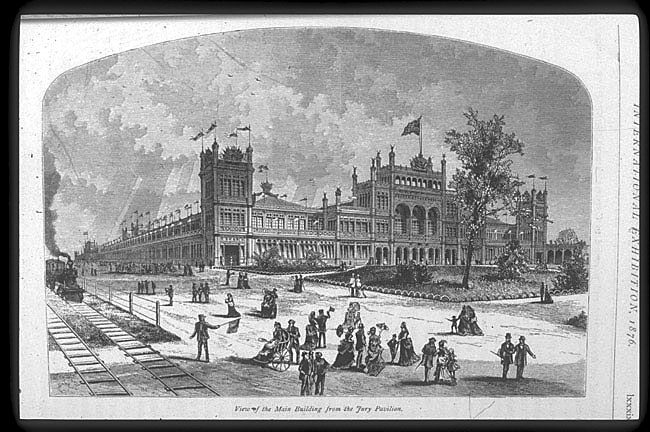
View of the Main Building from the Jury Pavilion (1878)

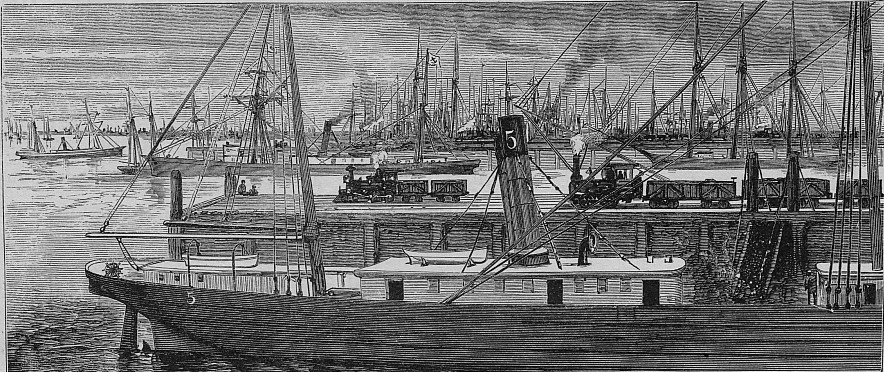
