= Ernest de Chamaillard =

French painter (1862–1931)

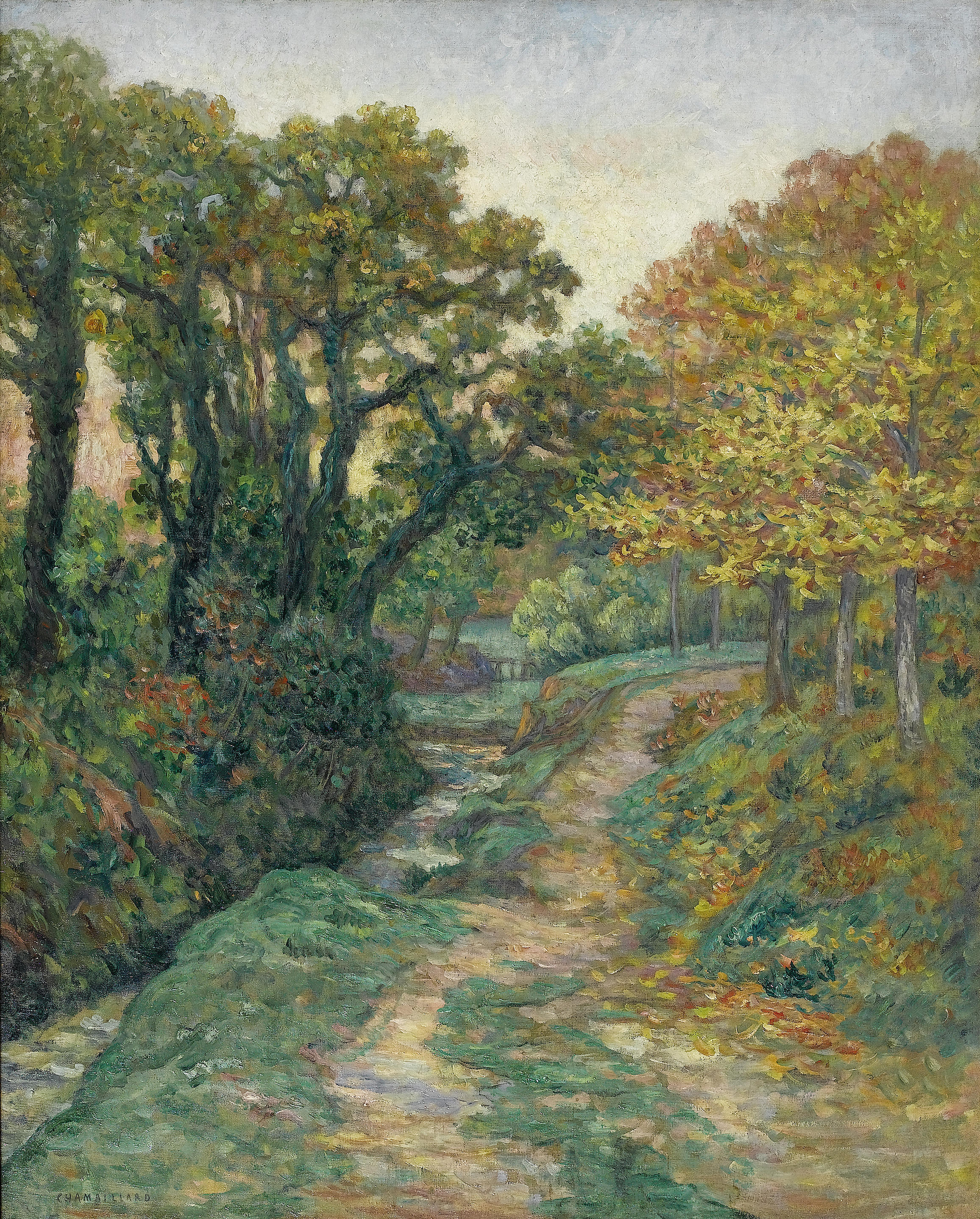
Ernest de Chamaillard: Le chemin creux près du ruisseau

Henri Ernest Ponthier de Chamaillard, usually known as Ernest de Chamaillard, (9 December 1862, Gourlizon – 1931, Eaubonne) was a French artist, one of a group of painters who gathered in the Breton village of Pont-Aven.

== Biography ==
The son of a lawyer, de Chamaillard also studied law but without much enthusiasm. As his real interest was painting, in June 1888 he went to Pont-Aven where he met Paul Gauguin. He quickly adopted Gauguin's Impressionism, joining the other painters in the group including Charles Laval, Émile Bernard and Henry Moret. There he also met Louise Lamour whom he married the same year in Jersey. He spent several years in the Pont-Aven region, painting many landscapes. Gauguin took him as a student, encouraging him to adopt his simplistic approach.

In 1893, unable to make a living from his painting, he moved to Châteaulin where he worked as a lawyer. In 1905, he went to Paris where he took up clerical work. He exhibited his work at the Bernheim-Jeune gallery in 1906 and 1910 with catalogue prefaces by Arsène Alexandre. He experienced material difficulties during the First World War, worsened by the deaths of his two sons. He again exhibited in 1925 and 1930 at the Georges Petit gallery in Paris.

== Bibliography ==
- Une préface inédite d'Apollinaire pour le peintre Ernest de Chamaillard in Guillaume Apollinaire, 1918-1968: études et informations réunies, Revue des lettres modernes, 1968, p. 156.
- Exposition Ernest Chamaillard: du 26 juin au 11 septembre 1976. Société de peinture de Pont-Aven, Hôtel de Ville, Bargain, 1976.
