= Milne Ramsey =

American painter

Milne Ramsey was born in Atlantic City, New Jersey in 1847 and died March 16, 1915, in Philadelphia was an American artist who painted still lifes, landscapes and nautical scenes. Ramsey studied at the Philadelphia Academy of Fine Arts and under Léon Bonnat in Paris. His artwork was exhibited during his lifetime at the Paris Salon and the Philadelphia Academy of Fine Arts. Ramsey spent the high point of his career in France but returned to Philadelphia during the last years of his life. The painter Anna Lownes was his pupil.
