= Herman van den Anker =

Dutch painter

Hermanus Franciscus Carolus "Herman" van den Anker (July 14, 1832 in Rotterdam – July 9, 1883 in Paris) was a Dutch artist who painted in Pont-Aven, Brittany.

In 1854 he moved from his home town to Paris, and in 1868 moved to Pont-Aven, where he remained the rest of his life. He painted figures in national Breton dress. Together with Fernand Quignon, he painted the board which hung in the village above the entrance to the Pension Gloanec, designed to encourage artists to stay there.

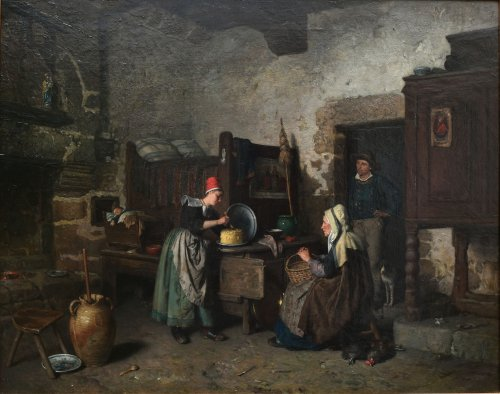
Hermanus-Franciscus Van den Anker ː La Marchande de beurre ou Le Partage du beurre (vers 1880-1882, musée de Pont-Aven).
