= Robert Wylie (artist) =

American artist

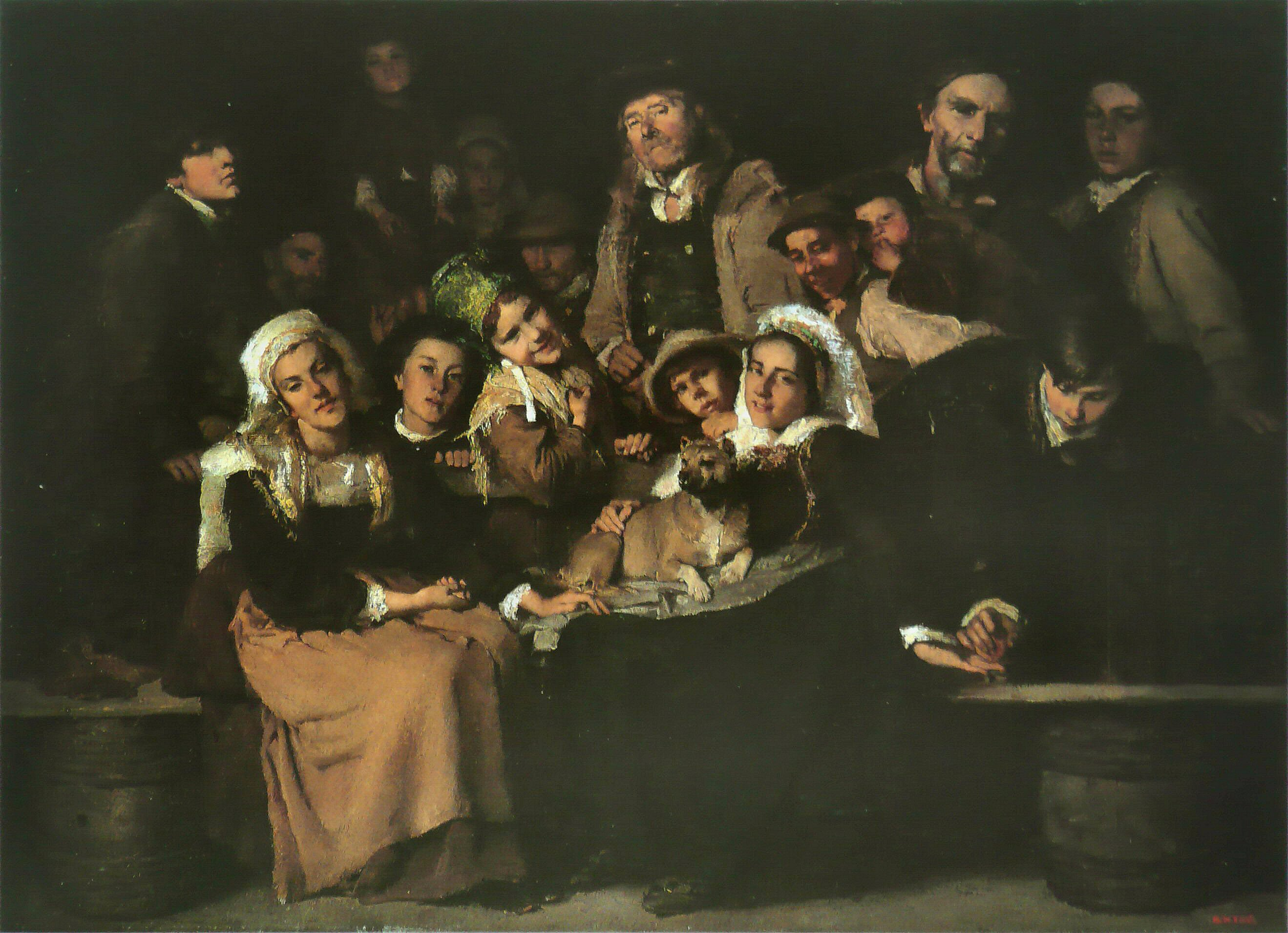
The Models of Pont-Aven, c. 1870, Terra Foundation for American Art, Daniel J. Terra Collection

Robert Wylie (c. 1839 – February 4, 1877), American artist, was born in the Isle of Man and relocated with his parents to the United States as a child.

Wylie studied in the schools of the Pennsylvania Academy of the Fine Arts, Philadelphia, later serving as a curator. In 1860, he helped found the Philadelphia Sketch Club, now one of the nation's oldest artists' clubs. His early work as a sculptor in Philadelphia is little known, with only a few works positively attributed to him.

In 1863, the directors of the Pennsylvania Academy sent Wylie to France to study. He went to Pont-Aven, Brittany, where he remained until his death there in 1877. He painted Breton peasants and scenes in the history of Brittany; among his important works was a large canvas, "The Death of a Vendean Chief," now at the Metropolitan Museum of Art, New York. He won a medal of the second class at the Paris Salon of 1872.

== See also ==
- Pont-Aven School
