= Meijer de Haan =

Dutch painter (1852–1895)

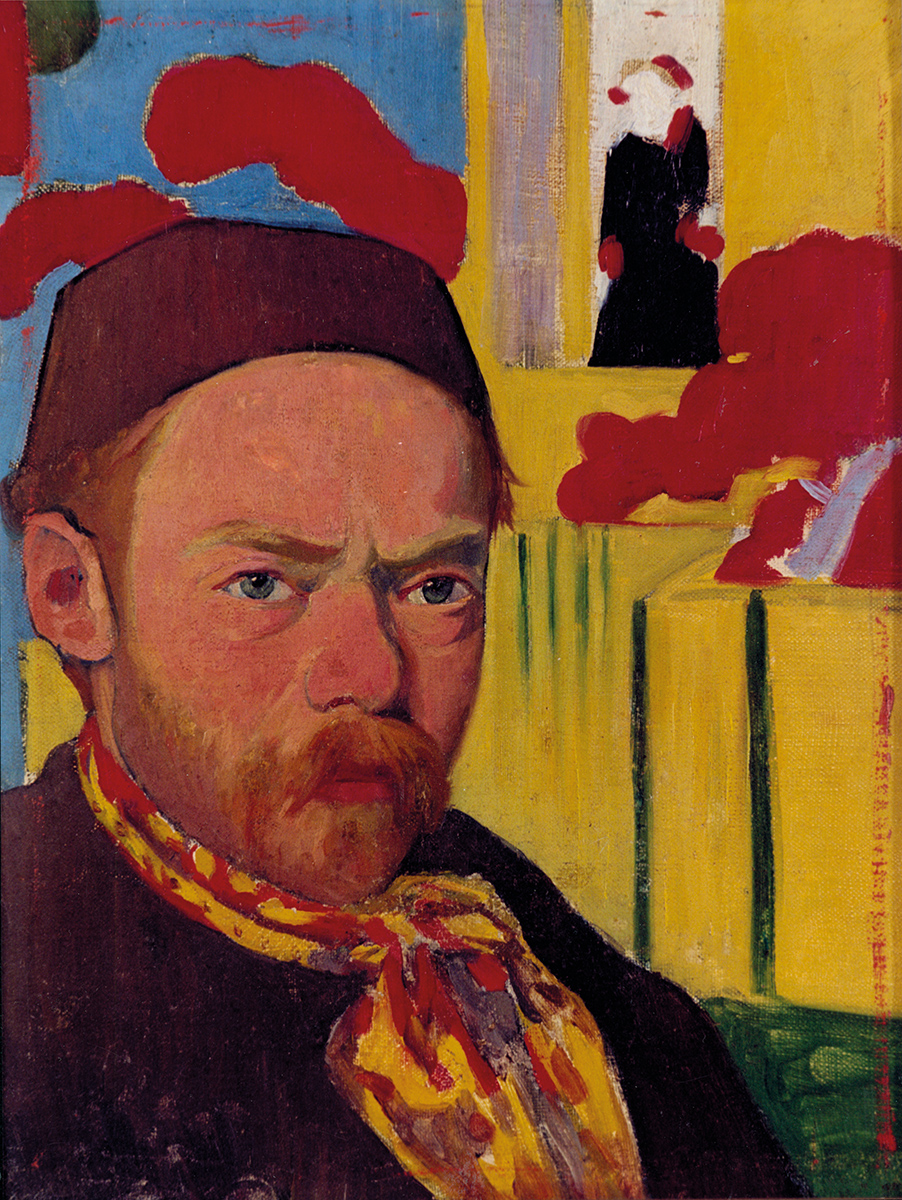
Self-portrait, 1889–1891. On 16 October 2012, stolen from the Kunsthal, Rotterdam and presumably destroyed.

Meijer Isaac de Haan (Amsterdam, 14 April 1852 – Amsterdam, 24 October 1895) was a Dutch painter. In French the name was written Meyer de Haan.

== Biography ==
He was born into a successful Jewish family of bread and matzo bakers who held to conservative views of religion, music and art. His maternal grandfather was a rich fabric merchant who owned several residential buildings.

An interest in fine art brought him to apprentice with the painter Petrus Franciscus Greive. In 1874, he was accepted into the Rijksacademie van beeldende kunsten at Amsterdam, but performed poorly. In 1880, one of his works was exhibited at the Paris Salon of that year. That same year, an illustration of de Haan's picture Een moeilijke plaats in de Talmoed appeared in the newspaper Eigen Haard, which generated much published discussion (not so much aesthetic as theological). He enjoyed some success in the Netherlands as a painter of Jewish genre works. In Amsterdam de Haan painted portraits and took on several pupils, including Joseph Jacob Isaacson, Louis Hartz and Baruch Lopes Leão de Laguna.

De Haan remained in Amsterdam until 1888, where he produced chiefly portraiture, and representations of working class Jews. His early work was inspired above all by the masters of the Dutch school, such as David Teniers and Rembrandt. The example of 17th century painting is reflected in his history painting of 1877–1888, Uriel Acosta. The critic I.N. Stemming (nom de plume of the painting Maurits van der Valk) disparaged the painting as "nothing more than a desiccated memory of Rembrandt and Munkaczy." De Haan had toiled for ten years on this magnum opus, which showed the rabbinical judgment against the 17th century Jewish philosopher Uriel Acosta over his opinion about the immortality of the soul. The displeasure the painting ignited in orthodox Jewish circles drove Meyer de Haan to leave for Paris in October 1888 with a monthly allowance from his family, and accompanied by his pupil, Isaacson. There he stayed with the art dealer Theo van Gogh for some months, and met Camille Pissarro. Theo introduced De Haan to his brother Vincent van Gogh, with whom de Haan exchanged several letters.

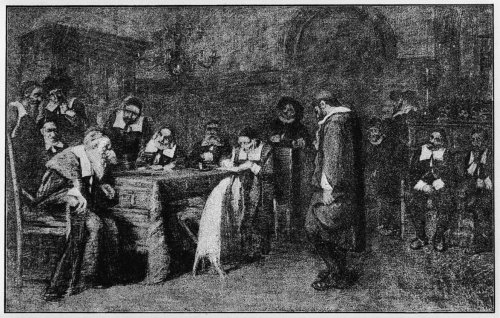
Uriel da Costa’s excommunication (1888) by Meijer de Haan took 8 years of work, received a huge backlash, disappeared shortly after and is missed till these days.

In May 1889 he travelled to Brittany, where in Pont-Aven he became friendly with Paul Gauguin. The two traveled to Le Pouldu, on the coast of the province for the winter of 1889 through 1890. There, De Haan conducted a liaison with Marie Henry, the owner of the seaside hotel-café Buvette de la plage, where De Haan and Gauguin lodged in 1890–1891. They covered the walls of the dining area with impressionist murals, such as Breton Women Stretching Hemp (1889). The work, papered over in the 1920s, was later uncovered, restored and sold.

Marie Henry gave birth to a daughter, Ida, in the summer of 1891 but De Haan left Le Pouldu and returned to Amsterdam. Though he never saw Marie Henry again, he later left all of his French paintings to Marie and her two daughters. The withdrawal of his family allowance and a sudden illness seem to have prevented Meyer de Haan from following Gauguin to Tahiti in early 1891. He probably returned to the Netherlands in 1891 where he continued to suffer from the ill-health that precipitated his early death.

Today, the bar Buvette de la plage has been restored to its former appearance, with modern reproductions installed to replace the original wall paintings.

In 2010, the Musée d'Orsay staged an exhibition of De Haan's work, called A Master Revealed: Meijer de Haan.

== Paintings ==
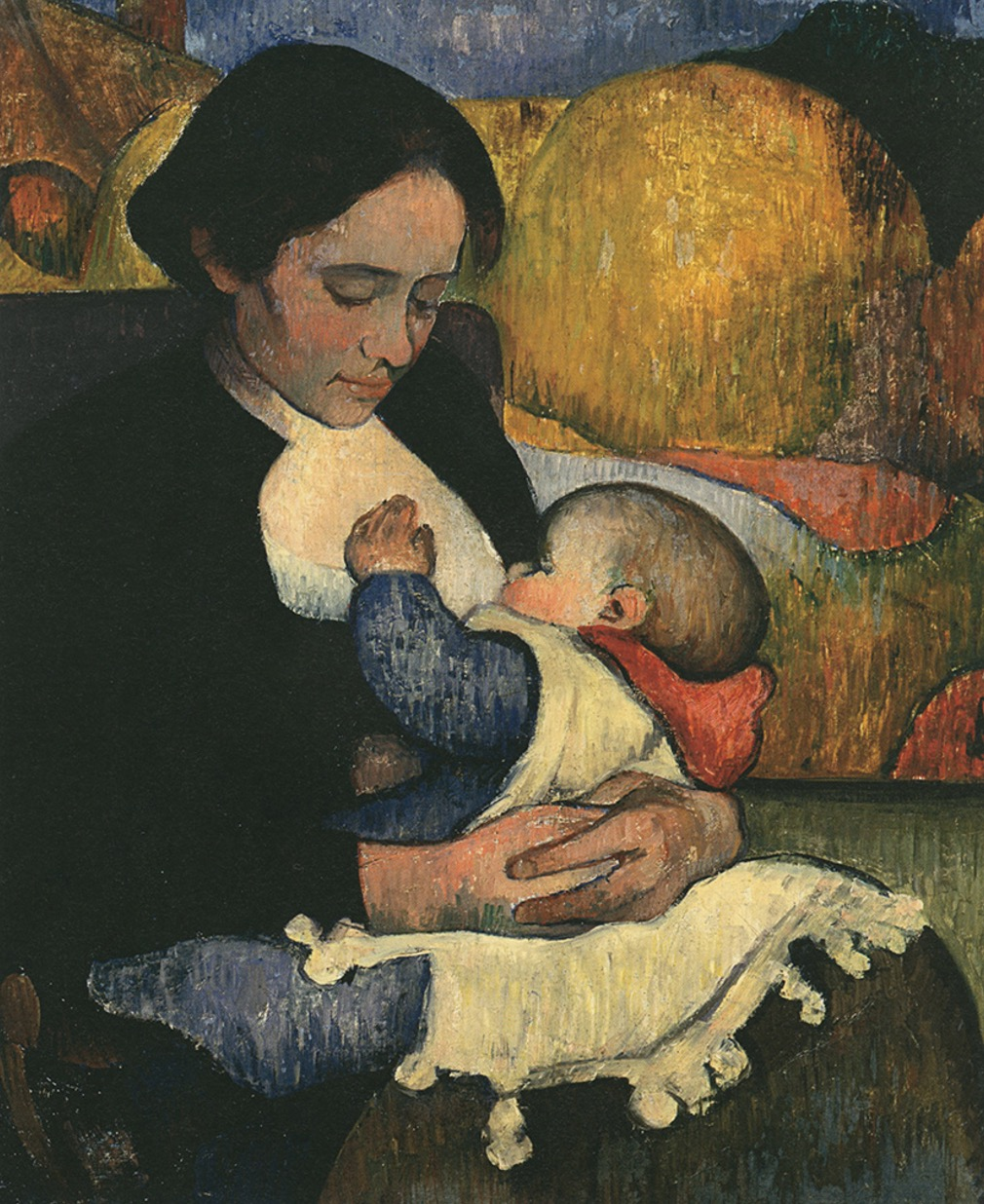
Maternity: Mary Henry Breastfeeding, in his post-impressionist style, 1890.

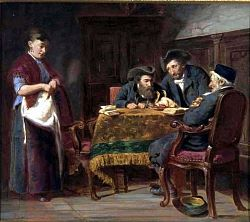
Before his trip south:The difficult question, 1880

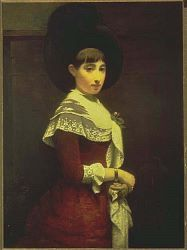
Portrait of a young Jewish woman, 1886

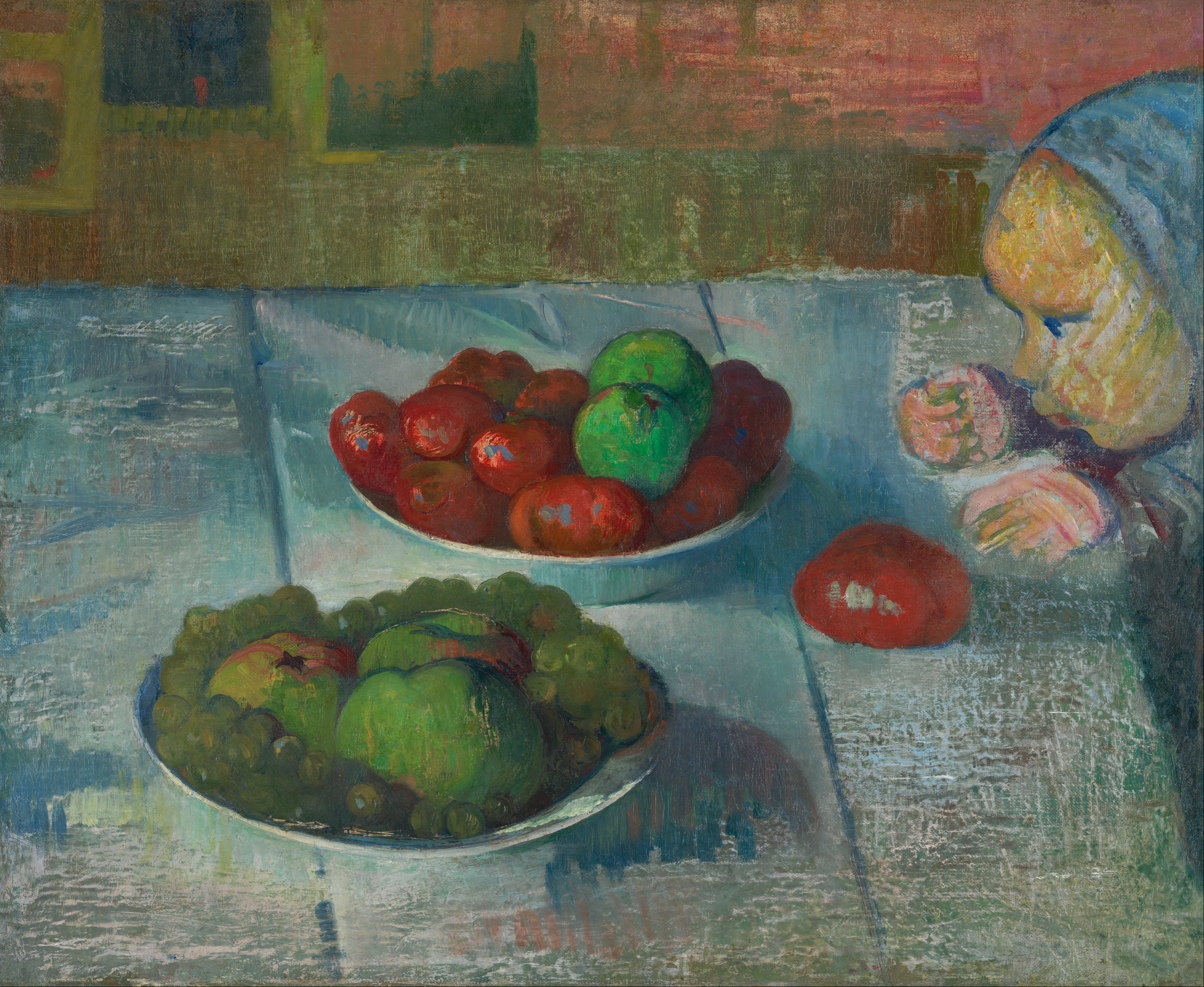
Still-life with Profile

== Bibliography ==
- J.W.C.A. Zürcher. Meijer de Haan’s Uriël Acosta. Amsterdam, 1888.
- Fernand Dauchot. "Meyer de Haan en Bretagne." Gazette des beaux-arts [suppl. is Chron. A.], 40 (1952), pp. 355–358.
- Wladyslawa Jaworska: "Jacob Meyer de Haan, 1852–1895." Nederlands(ch) kunsthistorisch jaarboek, 18 (1967), pp. 197–221.
- Wladyslawa Jaworska. Paul Gauguin et l’école de Pont-Aven. Neuchâtel: Ides et Calendes, 1971.
- B. Welsch-Ovcharov. Vincent van Gogh and the Birth of Cloisonism. Exh. cat. Art Gallery of Ontario, 1981.
- Jelke Kröger. A Master Revealed: Meijer de Haan. Exh. cat. Joods Historisch Museum, 2009.

== Sources ==
- Welsh-Ovcharov, Bogomila: Vincent van Gogh and the Birth of Cloisonism (!), Art Gallery of Ontario, Toronto, 24 January–22 March 1981 and Rijksmuseum Vincent van Gogh, Amsterdam, 9 April–14 June 1989 ISBN 0-919876-66-8
- Van Gogh museum with one of the original wall paintings of a spinning Breton girl
- Article (Dutch) on Meijer de Haan in the Amsterdam Joodshistorischmuseum
- Archival page for exhibition at Musee d'Orsay, Paris, 2010.
