= Jean Delville =

Occultist, painter, writer (1867–1953)

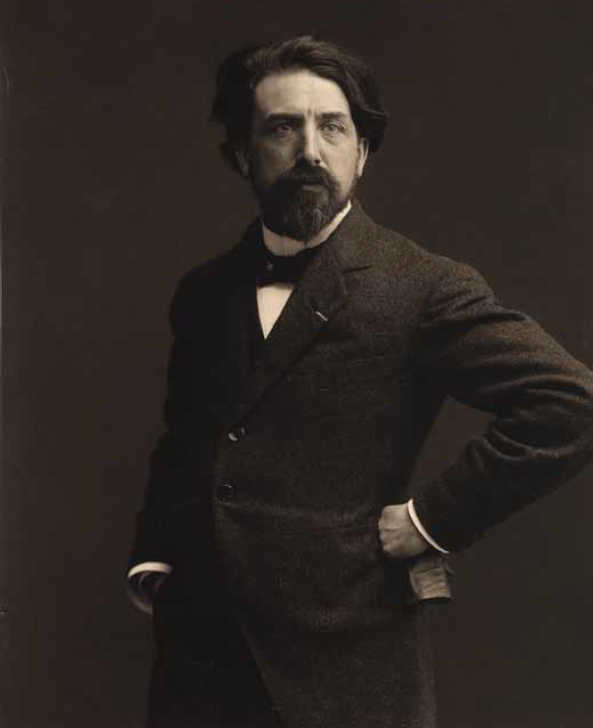
- Jean Delville in his studio in front of Orphée aux enfers, c. 1896
- Born: Jean Libert; 19 January 1867; Louvain, Belgium
- Died: 19 January 1953 (aged 86); Brussels, Belgium
- Education: Ecole des Beaux-arts, Brussels
- Known for: Painting, poetry, essayist, teaching
- Notable work: Tristan et Yseult, (1887); Le Cycle passionnel (1890; destroyed); La Symbolisation de la Chair et de l'Esprit (1890); L'Idole de la perversité (1891); Mysteriosa. Portrait de Mme Stuart Merrill (1892); La Morte d'Orphée (1893); L'Ange des splendeurs (1894); Les Trésors de Sathan (1895); L'Ecole de Platon (1898); L'Homme-Dieu (1903); Prométhée (1907); La Justice à travers les âges (1911–1914; destroyed); Les forces (1924); Les dernières idoles (1931); La Roue du monde (1940)
- Style: Classical idealist
- Movement: Idealist art (Symbolist art)
- Spouse(s): Marie Delville (née Lesseine; married: 29 October 1893)
- Awards: Prix de Rome (1895); Silver medal: L'Amour des Ames; Universal Exhibition, Paris (1900); Gold medal: L'Ecole de Platon; Universal exhibition, Milan (1906)
- Elected: Member of the Jury: Belgian Prix de Rome (1904); Premier professeur: Academie des beaux-arts, Brussels (1907); General Secretary: Belgian Section, Theosophical Society (1911–14); Member: Commission Royale des Monuments de Belgique (1919); Decorated: Grand Officier de l'Ordre de Léopold (1921); Member: l'Académie royal des sciences et des letters et des beaux-arts de Belgique (1924); President: Fédération Nationale des Artistes Peintres et Sculpteurs de Belgique (1926)
- Memorials: open-air bust on plinth: avenue des Sept Bonniers, Brussels

Jean Delville (born Jean Libert; 19 January 1867 – 19 January 1953) was a Belgian symbolist painter, author, poet, polemicist, teacher, and Theosophist. Delville was the leading exponent of the Belgian Idealist movement in art during the 1890s. He held, throughout his life, the belief that art should be the expression of a higher spiritual truth and that it should be based on the principle of Ideal, or spiritual Beauty. He executed a great number of paintings during his active career from 1887 to the end of the second World War (many now lost or destroyed) expressing his Idealist aesthetic. Delville was trained at the Académie des Beaux-arts in Brussels and proved to be a highly precocious student, winning most of the prestigious competition prizes at the Academy while still a young student. He later won the Belgian Prix de Rome which allowed him to travel to Rome and Florence and study at first hand the works of the artists of the Renaissance. During his time in Italy he created his celebrated masterpiece L'Ecole de Platon (1898), which stands as a visual summary of his Idealist aesthetic which he promoted during the 1890s in his writings, poetry and exhibitions societies, notably the Salons d'Art Idéaliste.

Characteristically, Delville's paintings are idea-based, expressing philosophical ideals derived from contemporary hermetic and esoteric traditions. At the start of his career, his esoteric perspective was mostly influenced by the work of Eliphas Levi, Edouard Schuré, Joséphin Péladan and Saint-Yves d'Alveydre, and later by the Theosophical writings of Helena Blavatsky and Annie Besant. The main underlying theme of his paintings, especially during his early career, has to do with initiation and the transfiguration of the inner life of the soul towards a higher spiritual purpose. Specifically they deal with themes symbolising Ideal love, death and transfiguration as well as representations of Initiates ('light bringers'), and the relationship between the material and metaphysical dimensions. His paintings and finished drawings are an expression of a highly sensitive visionary imagination articulated through precisely observed forms drawn from nature. He also had a brilliant gift for colour and composition and excelled in the representation of human anatomy. Many of his major paintings, such as his Les Trésors de Sathan (1895), l'Homme-Dieu (1903) and Les Ames errantes (1942), represent dozens of figures intertwined in complex arrangements and painted with highly detailed anatomical accuracy. He was an astonishingly skilled draughtsman and painter capable of producing highly expressive works on a grand scale, many of which can be seen in public buildings in Brussels, including the Palais de Justice.

Delville's artistic style is strongly influenced by the Classical tradition. He was a lifelong advocate of the value of the Classical training taught in the Academies. He believed that the discipline acquired as a result of this training was not an end in itself, but rather a valuable means of acquiring a solid drawing and painting technique to allow artists freely to develop their personal artistic style, without inhibiting their individual creative personality. Delville was a respected Academic art teacher. He was employed at the Glasgow School of Art from 1900 to 1906 and as Professor of drawing at the Académie des Beaux-arts in Brussels thereafter until 1937.

He was also a prolific and talented author. He published a very great number of journal articles during his lifetime as well as four volumes of poetry, including his Le Frisson du Sphinx (1897) and Les Splendeurs Méconnues (1922). He authored more than a dozen books and pamphlets relating to art and esoteric subjects. The most important of his published books include his esoteric works, Dialogue entre Nous (1895) and Le Christ Reviendra (1913) as well as his seminal work on Idealist art, La Mission de l'Art (1900). He also created and edited several contemporary journals and newspapers during the 1890s promoting his Idealist aesthetic including L'Art Idéaliste and La Lumière.

Delville was an energetic artistic entrepreneur, creating several influential artistic exhibition societies, including Pour l'Art and the Salons de l'Art Idéaliste in the 1890s and later, the Société de l'Art Monumental in the 1920s which was responsible for the decoration of public buildings including the mosaics in the hemicycle of the Cinquantenaire in Brussels. He also founded the very successful Coopérative artistique, which provided affordable art materials for artists at the time.

== Early years and training ==
Delville was born on 19 January 1867 at 2:00 a.m., rue des Dominicains in Louvain. He was born illegitimate into a working class household. His mother was Barbe Libert (1833–1905), the daughter of a canal worker who earned a living as a journalière as an adult. Delville never knew his father Joachim Thibault who was a lecturer in Latin and Greek at a local college and who came from a bourgeoisie family. He bore his mother's name until she married a functionary working in Louvain, Victor Delville (1840–1918). Victor adopted Jean who, until then, was known as Jean Libert. The family moved to Brussels in 1870 and settled in Boulevard Waterloo near Porte de Hal. The Delville family later moved to St Gilles where Delville began his schooling at the Ecole Communale in rue du Fort.

Delville took an early interest in drawing, even though his initial career ambitions were to become a Doctor. He was introduced to the artist Stiévenart by his adoptive grandfather, François Delville, while still a young boy. Delville recalls that this was 'the first artist I had ever seen, and for me, as a child, still unaware of my vocation, this was an enchanting experience.'

At the age of twelve, Delville entered the famous Athénée Royal in Brussels. His interest in art developed around this time and he received his father's permission to enroll in evening drawing classes at the Académie des Beaux-arts in the rue du Midi in 1879. He entered the course for drawing après la tête antique (after the classical head) and in 1882 classes for drawing après le torse et figure (after torso and face). Soon after he gave up his schooling at the Athénée to study full-time at the Académie. In 1883, he enrolled in the cours de peinture d’après nature (class in painting after nature) under the direction of the celebrated teacher Jean-François Portaels (1818–1895). Portaels objected to Delville's youth, but he excelled in the entrance examination and was unconditionally admitted to study painting under Portaels and Joseph Stallaert. Delville was a precocious talent and at age 17 won many of the major prizes at the Academy including 'drawing after nature', 'painting after nature', 'historical composition' (with high distinction), 'drawing after the antique', and ‘figure painting’.

== Artistic career 1887–1900 ==
=== L'Essor, 1887–1891 ===
Delville first exhibited in a public context at the moderate exhibition society called l'Essor from 1887 to 1891. His early works were largely depictions of working-class and peasant life executed in a contemporary realist style influenced by Constant Meunier. Delville's early efforts exhibited in 1887 were largely favourably reviewed in the contemporary press, notably L'Art Moderne and the Journal de Bruxelles, even if they were seen to be eclectic and derivative of the works of older established artists. These included works inspired by Baudelaire's poetry including his Frontispiece and L'épave (now lost) and his main work La Terre of which a detailed drawing still survives.

The following year his works were singled out as among the most outstanding of the 1888 exhibitors at L'Essor. This was the year in which he exhibited his highly controversial study for his painting La Mère depicting a woman in labour. A contemporary review described it in the following: 'On a huge bed with purple sheets ... a dishevelled standing woman displays her nudity as she writhes in spasmodic movements, bending under the pains of childbirth. Her face is contorted, her gnashing teeth alternate with the curse, her clenched hands lift the bed cover over her belly in an unconscious reflex of modesty ... abominable vision ....! and poor women!' This subject, rarely depicted in art, was seen to be shocking and contrary to bourgeois taste. It does however signal an aspect of Delville's art to depict ideas that are vivid and provocative.

During the 1880s, Delville's work tended towards social realism. This included images of workers and peasants (Soir and Paysan, 1888); of beggars and destitution (Asile de nuit, 1885); of hunger (L’Affamé,1887) and ultimately of death (Le Dernier Sommeil, 1888). Here he focussed on themes of poverty, despair and hopelessness. In an undated drawing titled Le las d’Aller Delville depicts a fallen figure curled up on his side in a barren landscape, asleep, or perhaps even dead. However, during the period 1888–1889 his artistic interests started developing in a more non-realist direction and began to move towards Idealism, which dominated his work from then on. This was first indicated in his Fragment d’une composition: Le cycle de la passion (now lost) displayed at L'Essor in 1889. The final work Le Cycle passionnel (9 × 6 metres) was displayed at L'Essor the following year (1890) and was inspired by Dante's Divine Comedy. It depicts a vast composition of intertwined figures floating through the nether regions of hell. The theme concerns lovers who have succumbed to their erotic passions. One of the main themes of initiation is to control one's lower passions in order to achieve spiritual transcendence. This painting of this work represents this idea in metaphoric form. This is an early major work by Delville sadly destroyed in the incendiary attack on Louvain in 1914. Despite its importance, it was not received with much enthusiasm in the contemporary press.

Another work that display Delville's growing interest in non-realist ideas during the 1880s is his more well-known Tristan et Yseult (Royal Museums of Fine Art, Brussels, 1887). The work is inspired by Wagner's eponymous opera and deals with the relationship between love and death and the idea of transcendence that can be achieved through both. It is an early work that reveals themes closely related to the initiatory tradition which is fully discussed in Brendan Cole's recent book on Delville.

A further important work dealing with non-realist, or Idealist, subject matter was exhibited by Delville at the final L'Essor exhibition in 1891 titled La Symbolisation de la chair et de l'ésprit (the original is lost, but a detailed study recently came up for auction). It depicts a naked female figure dragging a nude male beneath the water. Bright light appears above the male figure while dark sub-aquatic vegetation surrounds the base of the female. The initiatory theme here is self-evident in its depiction of the conflict between spirit (light) and matter (dark vegetation). The male aspires towards the light but is dragged down towards the bottom of the dark mass of water. The work establishes an essential duality between consciousness/unconsciousness, light/dark, as well as spirituality and materialism. In Delville's writings he emphasises this duality and its reconciliation, a theme that pervades much of Symbolist art and writings and was conspicuous amongst Romantic artists as well, especially the writings of Goethe. The theme dominates Delville's art. He wrote that:

'Men have two very distinct trends in them. One of these two trends is physical, which must, of course, provide for his preservation by physical means, having the task of sustaining tangible life, sustaining the body. The other trend, which is not only immaterial but indefinable, is that which arises as a perpetual aspiration beyond the material, for which this world is not enough: it is this 'something else' that overcomes all distances or is, rather, unknowable. This is the very threshold of the occult world, in front of which all science, seized with unsteadiness, prostrates itself in the insuperable premonition of a world beyond!'

=== Pour L'Art 1892–1895 ===
Delville's growing interest in Idealist art led him to instigate a succession from L'Essor to start a new exhibition society called Pour L'Art. Many of the younger artists of L'Essor followed him which led to the dissolution of that group. Pour L'Art became one of the noted avant-garde exhibition societies on Brussels at the time. The leading avant-garde exhibition forum at the time was Les XX. Following Les XX, Pour L'Art invited international artists as well, several of whom became well known in Symbolist circles, including Carlos Schwabe, Alexandre Séon, Charles Filiger and Jan Verkade. Their first exhibition took place in November 1892 and the works displayed were executed in either an Impressionist or Symbolist idiom. Delville designed the poster for the first exhibition depicting a long-necked sphinx – a key symbol of the period – cupping a flaming chalice in her hands. Delville's main work of that year was his L'Idole de la Perversité which can be considered one of the major images of the period. The new group received a largely positive press during the time. The group was closely associated with Joséphin Péladan's Salons de la Rose + Croix in Paris, and Péladan was frequently invited to lecture in Brussels at the time by members of the Pour L'Art group.

The second exhibition of the Pour L'Art group took place in January 1894. Significantly the society also included the applied, or decorative arts, which were become widely popular at the time and a particular feature of Art Nouveau. Tapestries, book-bindings, and wrought-iron work were displayed alongside the paintings. The influence of Delville and Péladan was evident in the predominance of idealist works of art influenced by late fifteenth-century Florentine art, the work of Gustave Moreau, Puvis de Chavannes and the tendency towards large-scale figure compositions. The show was enthusiastically received by the press.

Delville's main works exhibited that year were his celebrated La Mort d'Orphée (1893, Royal Museums of Fine Art, Brussels) and his Mysteriosa or Portrait of Mrs Stuart Madame Stuart Merrill (1892, Royal Museums of Fine Art, Brussels). His work was enthusiastically praised in the press. The leading critic Ernest Verlant wrote:

One of the principal members of the Pour L'Art group, in view of his talent and astonishing fecundity, is Jean Delville, who is also a writer and a poet; with a powerful imagination that is funereal and tormented. These epithets are equally suited to his large painting La Proie, a crimson vision of apocalyptic murder, similar to his vast composition from last year, Vers l’inconnu, and of several before that. … Here and there, for example, in L’homme du glaive, the Murmure profane, and Mysteriosa, he pushes the intensity of expression to its extreme. Elsewhere, as in Satana, he draws together, rather bizarrely, esoteric attributes in a figure derived from da Vinci. But we are able only to express praise in front of Orphée, a dead head floating between the shafts of a large lyre; in front of Elegia, a long and supple female body appearing under the spurting and cascading waters of a fountain; in front of Au Loin and Maternitas, two figures pensively leaning on their elbows, of which the first of the two has a great nobility. These works are monochrome, or nearly so. Their expression is accurate, fine, subtle, refined, not too explicit, and all the more eloquent.

The final Pour L'Art show took place in January 1895. Delville also participated for the last time in Péladan's Salons de la Rose + Croix. This was the year when he began preparing the formation of his own exclusively Idealist exhibition society, the Salons d'Art Idéaliste, which opened the following year. By this time the Pour L'Art salons were well-established, successful and enthusiastically supported by the contemporary press. Delville's L'Ange des splendeurs (1894, Royal Museums of Fine Art, Brussels), was Delville's main work of that show. Although not widely praised it stands, according to Brendan Cole, as one of his initiatory paintings par excellence of Delville's oeuvre.

=== Delville and Péladan's Salons de la Rose + Croix 1892–1895 ===
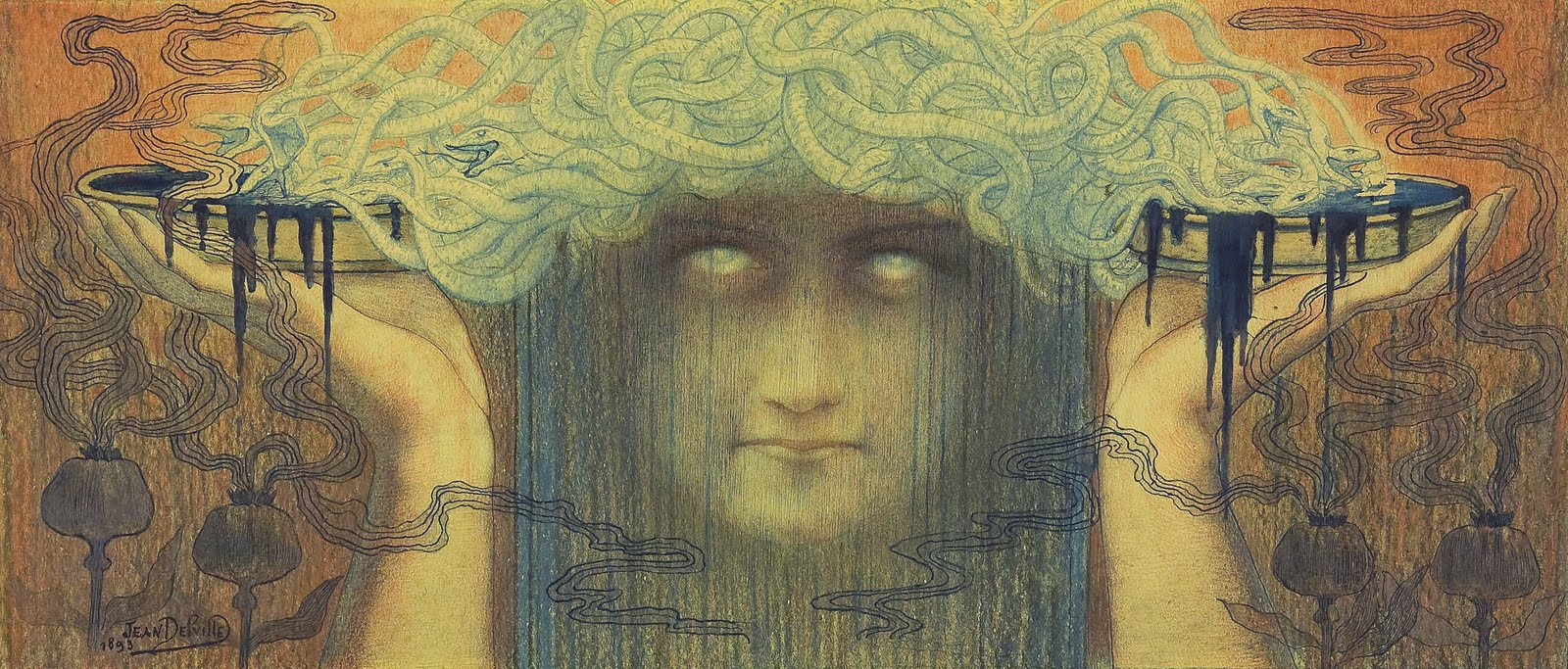
La Méduse by Jean Delville (1893).

Delville exhibited at Joséphin Péladan's Salons de la Rose + Croix for the first four years of their existence (1892–1895), which coincided with his own Pour l'Art salons. At this time Delville was closely allied to Péladan and his ideals. Delville probably met Péladan in Paris when he accompanied one of the touring exhibitions of L'Essor, around 1888.

Delville shared Péladan's concept of creating a forum that showcased art of an exclusively Idealist persuasion. Delville sought to bring Idealist art into the public eye in Belgium through the Pour l'Art salons, but more specifically in the Salons d'Art Idéalist which he founded in 1895 and opened to the public in 1896.

By 1896, Delville began severing formal ties with Péladan, which cleared the way for his move towards Theosophy later that decade. Delville records his association with Péladan in his autobiography:

'... my personality as an idealist painter emerged more and more. I made the acquaintance of Péladan and became interested in and started participating in the esoteric movement in Paris and Brussels. I exhibited at the Rosicrucian Salon where only idealist art was allowed. Péladan exhibited several of my works there, notably La Mort d’Orphée which he placed at the centre of the exhibition, along with La chair et l’esprit and some drawings. Under his influence, I went to live in Paris, where I stayed on the Quai Bourbon among some Rosicrucian friends, disciples of Péladan. I stayed there for several months occupying my time not only with the organization of the Péladanesque salons, but also in painting the set of Babylone which was an overall success.'

==== Salon de la Rose + Croix: 1892 ====
In 1892, at the first Salon, Delville exhibited his La symbolisation de la chair et de l’esprit (which was reproduced in the catalogue to the first exhibition) as well as his l’Idole de la Perversité.

==== Salon de la Rose + Croix: 1893 ====
In 1893, at the second Salon, Delville exhibited eight works: Imperia; Élegia; La symbolisation de la chair et de l’esprit; L’Annonciateur; Le Murmure profane; Mysteriosa; Vers l’Inconnu; and L’Homme de Glaive.

==== Salon de la Rose + Croix: 1894 ====
In 1894, at the third Salon, Delville exhibited seven works: La Mort d’Orphée; La Fin d’un règne; Le Geste d’Ame; Satana; Maternitas; Etude féminine; and La Tranquille.

==== Salon de la Rose + Croix: 1895 ====
In 1895, at the fourth and final Salon, Delville exhibited four works, including his portrait of Péladan: Portrait du Grand Maître de la Rose+Croix en habit de choeur and L’Ange des splendeurs. Many of these works would be displayed in Brussels as well in Delville's Pour l'Art exhibitions.

=== Prix de Rome and sojourn in Italy, 1895 ===
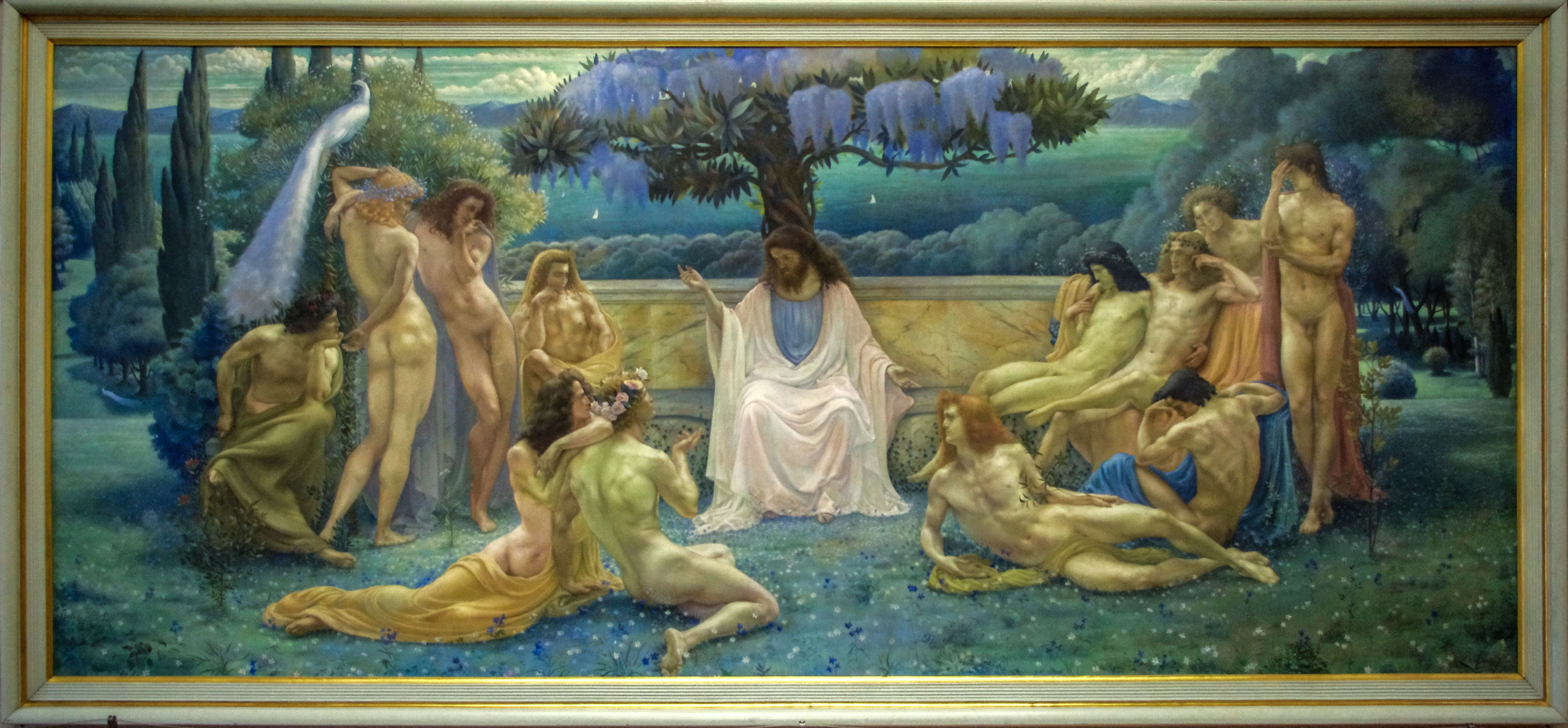
L'Ecole de Platon by Jean Delville (1898).

Delville lived as an indigent artist in St Gilles in Brussels during the course of his early career. By the middle of the 1890s he was married and had a growing family which he struggled to support as an artist. On the advice of his close friend, the sculptor Victor Rousseau, he was motivated to enter the prestigious Prix de Rome, which came with a very generous bursary that also covered the costs for a lengthy sojourn in Italy. Delville won the 1895 competition, but his entry created a controversy amongst his peers given the 'Establishment' nature of the Prix that ran counter to the ideals of the avant-garde at the time. Delville was by then a fairly established figure in avant-garde circles and his association with the Prix de Rome appeared to be a betrayal of their cause. The Prix de Rome, however, also meant that Delville could spend a significant amount of time in Italy studying the Classical art of the Renaissance that he admired so much.

The rules of the competition were stringent. Competitors were isolated in small studios in the Academy of Fine Arts in Antwerp which ran the competition and were expected to produce a finished drawing of their composition before setting to work on the final painting. A strict time-limit was imposed on competitors to finish the work. The competition opened in June 1895 and the winner was announced in October. The theme of the competition that year was Le Christ glorifié par les enfants. Delville recorded his experience in his autobiography:

The rules were demanding … At that time the six selected competitors for the final exam had to paint their work in a secluded lodge, after leaving the original preliminary drawing in a hallway of the Antwerp Academy. It was strictly forbidden to bring any drawings into the lodge, only live models were allowed there. While working on their painting, the competitors had to change their clothes each time they entered their lodge, after having been visited by a specially appointed supervisor. These procedural requirements were the moral guarantee of this great contest in which these artists from the country took part…. As soon as they were selected, they entered into a lodge in order to produce, over three days, the sketch of the requisite painting, and they were given eighty days to complete it without receiving any visitors or advice from anyone – in order to ensure that the competitors were the unique and personal author of the work so that the jury, composed of the country’s most well-known artists, could cast a definitive judgement.

During his stay Delville was expected to paint original works reflecting his studies of classical art as well as to make copies after the old masters. He was also expected to send regular reports back to the Antwerp Academy relating to his work there. The experience proved to be a turning point in his career and brought to focus his ideal to synthesise the classical tendency in art with his interest in esoteric philosophy which was the defining attribute of his Idealist aesthetic form then onwards. Delville produced several remarkable paintings during his time in Rome that reflect a dramatic evolution in his art towards a more refined expression of this Idealist aesthetic. These included his outstanding Orphée aux enfers (1896), a key initiatory work, as well as his great masterpiece of the period, his L'Ecole de Platon (1898), which he exhibited at the 1898 Salon d'Art Idéalist to universal praise. In 1895, Delville published his first book on esoteric philosophy, Dialogue entre Nous.

=== The Salons d'Art Idéaliste 1896–1898 ===
Delville's Salons D'Art Idéaliste were exclusively devoted to exhibiting artwork of an Idealist nature. Delville signalled his programme in a series of polemical articles during the course of the months preceding the opening of the first Salon, which created some controversy amongst his contemporaries. Delville's ideas were bold and confrontational, but it was characteristic of him to stick to the courage of his convictions and to carry his projects through with relentless energy and determination. The aim of the Salons were couched in a short manifesto published before the opening of the first Salon. This is an early instance of a new avant-garde art movement supported by a manifesto, something that would be a commonplace in later Modernist movements and after. The salons were also accompanied by a series of lectures and musical soirées. Delville's salons were also significant for their inclusion of women artists, something almost unheard of in other contemporary avant-garde exhibition societies. The manifesto provides a valuable record of the Idealist movement founded by Delville:

The intention of the Salons d’Art Idéaliste is to give rise to an aesthetic Renaissance in Belgium. They bring together, in one annual grouping, all the scattered elements of artistic idealism, that is to say, works with the same leanings towards beauty. Wishing in this way to react against the decadence, against the confusion of the so-called realist, impressionist or libriste schools (degenerate art forms), the Salons d’Art Idéaliste champion the following as eternal principles of perfection in a work of art: thought, style, and technique. The only thing they recognize as free, within aesthetics, is the creative personality of the artist, and maintain, in the name of harmony, that no work is susceptible to true art unless it is composed of the three absolute terms, namely: spiritual beauty, plastic beauty and technical beauty. Similar, if not identical, to the Parisian Rose & Croix Salons created by Sâr Joséphin Péladan and to the Pre-Raphaelite movement in London, the Salons d’Art Idéaliste claim to wish to continue, through modern developments, the great tradition of idealist art, from the ancient masters to present-day masters.

Delville's main work exhibited that year was his visionary Trésors de Sathan (1895, Royal Museums of Fine Art, Brussels). The work had previously been on show at the Salon de Gand. The depiction of a satanic figure represented under water was unique in Western Art. Instead of wings he is represented with long octopus tentacles. His 'treasures' are the sleeping figures surrounded with jewels and gold coins, objects representing materialism and avarice. The figures show no sign of torment, but are rather represented in a state of somnolent bliss, as though they have succumbed to all that is 'satanic' in Delville's occult view: sensual pleasure and materialism. The work is an apotropaic icon against the snares of the lower passions and the world of matter and sensuality generally.

The second Salon took place in March 1897 at Edmond Picard's arts venue, la Maison d'Art. Delville's contributions were small and included his Orphée aux Enfers, Parsifal and L’Oracle à Dodone, which are now, apart from Parsifal, in private collections. At the time Delville was in Italy on his prescribed sojourn there after winning the coveted Prix de Rome. The show received largely positive reviews in the press and Delville's Salons were becoming more widely accepted, despite his aggressive polemics in the months prior to their establishment which hackled his contemporaries. What was noted as a feature of this Idealist art was its intellectual nature and the proclivity towards the expression of ideas.

The final Salon d'Art Idéaliste took place in March 1898 and was marked by the exhibition of Delville's great masterpiece, his l'Ecole de Platon (1898, Musée D'Orsay), which marked the culmination of his Idealist programme and widely celebrated amongst his contemporary critics, even those who were previously hostile to his art and aesthetic programme.

== After 1900 ==
In 1895, Delville published his Dialogue entre nous, a text in which he outlined his views on occultism and esoteric philosophy. Brendan Cole discusses this text in detail his book on Delville, pointing out that, although the Dialogue reflects the ideas of a number of occultists, it also reveals a new interest in Theosophy. In the late 1890s, Delville joined the Theosophical Society. He was probably introduced to Theosophy directly through his friendship with Edouard Schuré, the author of the widely influential book Les Grandes Initiés. Schuré wrote the preface to Delville's work on Idealist Art, La Mission de l'Art (1900). Delville also came into close alliance with Annie Besant who inherited the leadership of the Theosophical movement. Besant gave a series of lectures in Brussels in 1899 titled La Sagesse Antique. Delville reviewed her talks in an article published in Le Thyrse that year. It is probably from this point onwards that Delville became actively involved in the Theosophical Movements as such. Delville founded La Lumière, a journal devoted to Theosophical ideas in 1899, and published articles from leading Theosophists of the day, including Besant. Delville became the first General Secretary of the Belgian branch of the Theosophical Society in 1911.

Delville's art flourished after 1900 and he produced some of his greatest works during this period up to the First World War. He worked with undiminished strength and imagination and his paintings revealed a visionary sense of the transcendental inspired by his involvement in the Theosophical movement, seen typically in works such as his monumental L'Homme-Dieu (1903, Brughes: Groeninge Museum) and Prométhée (1907, Free University Brussels). His most striking achievement, however, is his series of five vast canvases that decorated the Cour d'Assises in the Palais de Justice on the theme of 'Justice through the Ages'. These works, monumental in conception and scale and no doubt amongst his finest, were unfortunately destroyed during the second World War as a result of German bombing of the Palais de Justice on 3 September 1944. The irony of this action in relation to the theme of this cycle of paintings cannot be overlooked. Small-scale replacements were installed during the reconstruction of the Palais after the War. The gigantic original central painting, titled La Justice, la Loi et la Pitié, measured 11 metres by 4.5 metres. This worked was flanked by two works, La Justice de Moïse and La Justice chrétienne (both 4 by 3 metres). The two remaining panels represents Justice of the past and present: La Justice d'autrefois and La Justice moderne.

=== Professor at the Glasgow School of Art, 1900–1906 ===
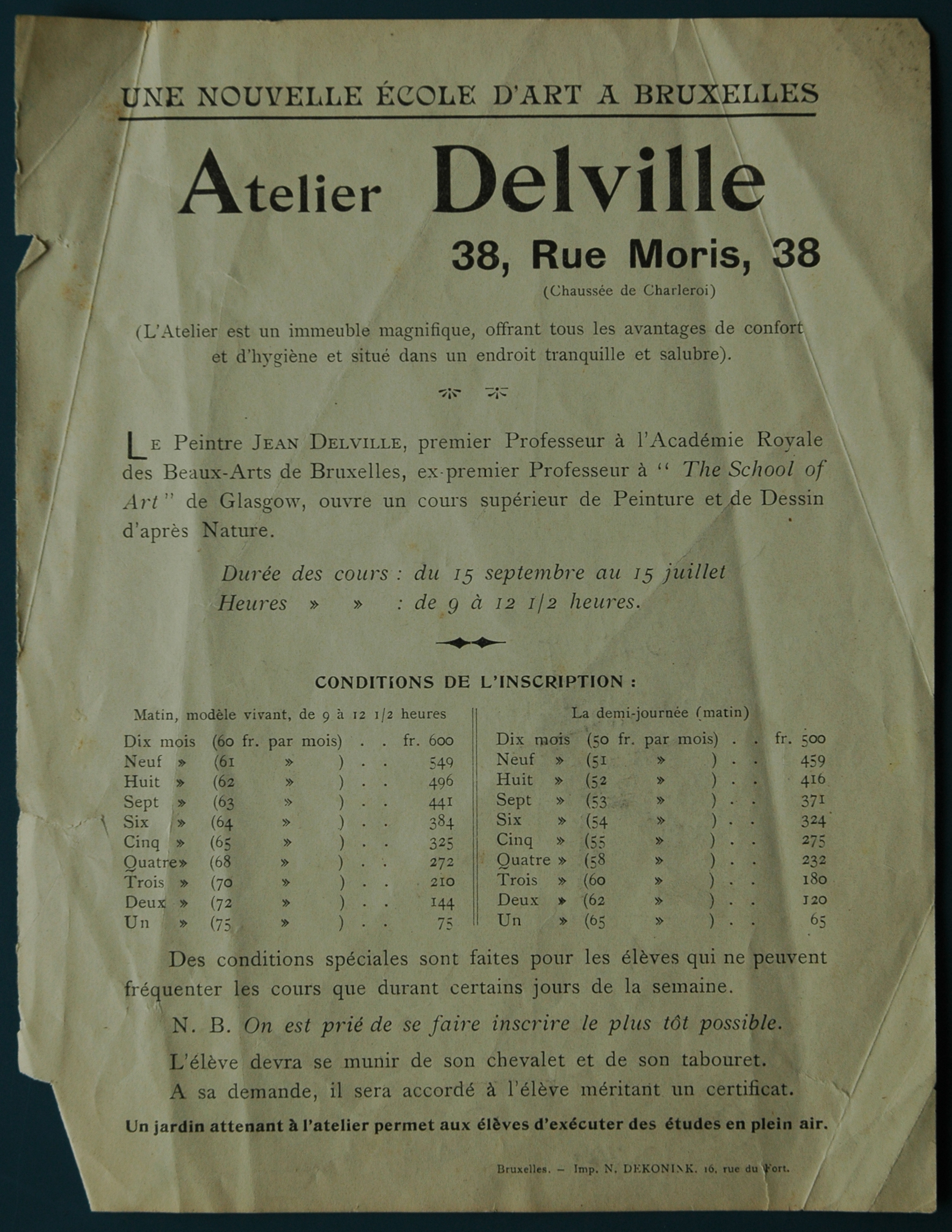
Poster advertising Delville's private atelier (c. 1906).

Delville hoped to secure a teaching place at the Academy in Brussels, but was offered instead a teaching position at the flourishing Glasgow School of Art in 1900. His tenure there was highly successful, and the works of the students he trained were celebrated at the annual exhibitions in London. When Delville returned to Brussels in 1907, many of his British students followed him to further their training under his tutelage in his private studio in rue Morris. At that time, Delville fulfilled his ambition to teach at the Brussels Academy and was appointed Professor of Life Studies, a post he held until his retirement in 1937.

=== The First World War: Exile in London 1914–1918 ===
When war broke out, Delville, amongst many Belgians, was welcomed in Britain as exiles. He moved there with his entire family, including his wife and four younger children and settled in Golders Green in London. His two oldest sons, Elie and Raphaël Delville, were conscripted into the Belgian war effort (both survived the conflict). Delville played an active role in London through his writings, art and public addresses (he was a gifted orator) in support of the Belgians in exile and the conflict against the Germans. He contributed to the Belgian expatriate newspaper in London, L'Indépendance Belge and wrote several articles and poems virulently condemning German aggression. He was an active member of the philanthropic society for Belgian refugees, La Ligue des Patriotes de Belgique, and was the president of La Ligue des Artistes belges that was responsible for the creation of the successful publication Belgian Art in Exile, the sale of which raised money for Belgian charities in England. The work contains a great number of representative paintings and other works of art by contemporary Belgian artists. The volume was generally well received. The Sketch ran a supportive editorial in their January edition and gave informative information about the volume:

Belgian Art in Exile is the title of a very attractive album of reproductions, mostly in colour, of paintings by exiled Belgian artists, with photographs of works by Belgian sculptors, which has been issued in aid of the Belgian Red Cross and other Belgian charitable institutions. The colour-plates, which are beautifully reproduced, show the high quality and great versatility of modern Belgian art. Particularly notable is a picture of a Moorish cavalry charge, by Alfred Bastien, who since he came to this country has done some fine work for the Illustrated London News. Among many other well-known Belgian artists represented are Albert Baertsoen, Jean Delville, Emile Claus, Herman Richir, Comte Jacques de Lalaing, and Paul Dubois. A fine painting by Frank Brangwyn – Mater Dolorosa Belgica – forms a pictorial introduction", as the frontispiece. Maeterlinck contributes a eulogy of King Albert, and there are poems by Emile Verhaeren, Marcel Wyseur, and Jean Delville, who also writes an introduction. The volume is published by Colour (25, Victoria Street, S.W. at 5s. and (in cloth) 73. 6d., with a limited edition de luxe at £1. Both for itself and the cause it should command a wide sale.

At that time Delville was also an active Freemason and was involved in La Loge Albert 1er that reunited Belgian Freemasons in exile living in Britain. His time in exile also inspired several important paintings, including: La Belgique indomptable (1916), depicting a sword-wielding allegorical female figure holding off an attacking Germanic eagle, Les Mères (1919), depicting a group of mourning mothers surrounded by dead corpses of their fallen sons, and Sur l'Autel de la patrie (1918), a modern pieta depicting a female figure with the corpse of a bleeding dead soldier at her feet. His most notable work of this period is his Les Forces (completed in 1924), depicting two vast celestial armies confronting each other. The forces of light, represented on the right, are led by a Christ-like figure seated on a horse and a torch-bearing winged figure leading an army of angels into the fray against a battalion of dark forces streaming in from the left. The work is on open display in the Palais de Justice in the vast cour des pas perdus and is grand in scale, measuring 5 metres by 8 metres.

=== The Société de l'Art Monumental 1920 ===
From an early point in his career Delville was interested in producing art that would be displayed in public spaces for the edification of all. For him, art was a means of uplifting the public, and to this end he despised art that was produced for an elite clique, sold by dealers for the benefit of collectors who saw in art no more than an investment opportunity. Delville's ideals were strongly aligned to the idea of a social purpose for art, about which he wrote extensively during his career. In his Mission de l'Art he wrote: 'If the purpose of Art, socially speaking, is not to spiritualise the weighted thinking of the public, then one has the right to ask oneself, what is truly its usefulness, or more precisely, its purpose'. Although he had already created several large artistic schemes that decorated public buildings, notably his panels for the Palais de Justice, his ambition formally to pursue this aim was finally realised in 1920 when he collaborated with several leading painters of his generation to create the Société de l'Art Monumental (Society for Monumental Art). The aim of the group was to bring together painters, artists and architects who would draw attention to the need for art specifically created for public buildings.

An important realisation of this aim was the decoration of the walls in the colonnades of the hemicycles flanking the Arcade of the Parc du Cinquantenaire. Five artists collaborated with Delville on this project: Constant Montald, Emile Vloors, Omer Dierickx, Emile Fabry and Albert Ciamberlani. The last two were friends of Delville's since his days at the academy and had collaborated on many project before. Most of these artists had also exhibited in Delville's Idealist forums, Pour L'Art and the Salons d'Art Idéaliste during the 1890s.

The project went ahead under the patronage of King Albert I, and was paid for through a scheme of national subscription.

The overall theme of this major cycle of works was a patriotic commemoration of 'The Glorification of Belgium' following the Great War through allegorical images relating to war and peace. In 1924 Delville expressed his idea for the cycle as a 'vision of a frieze in mosaic unfurling its rhythm of lines and its harmony of colours between the columns of the hemicycle'.

Each artist prepared six individual works (cartoons) that were then adapted to the final mosaics which were three metres high and aligned to the top part of the wall. The total distance of all the mosaics was 120 metres. An overall harmony of all the individual panels was achieved by ensuring that the artists adhered to a few common rules of composition: using the same horizon line, using the same scale for the figures, and adhering to a limited palette of related colours. The specific theme to the left of the arcade is that of Belgium at peace. Works by Fabry, Vloors and Montald represent respectively material life, intellectual life and moral life. The specific theme to the right represents heroic Belgium, with works by Delville, Ciamberlani and Dierickx representing respectively victory, a tribute to heroes and war.

The project was conceived between 1922 and 1926 and completed in 1932. The mosaics themselves were executed by Jean Lahaye and Emile Van Asbroeck of the company A Godchol.

This monumental creation was a vindication of Idealist trends in art presented in a public space and gave his artistic perspective a wider visibility amongst the general public.

Working towards the public good and alleviating the suffering of mankind was also a principle ideal of the Theosophists, an ideal to which Delville's subscribed throughout his life. Delville's Theosophical-socialist views were articulated in two articles his published before the war: Socialisme de demain (1912) and Du Principe sociale de l'Art (1913).

== Later years ==
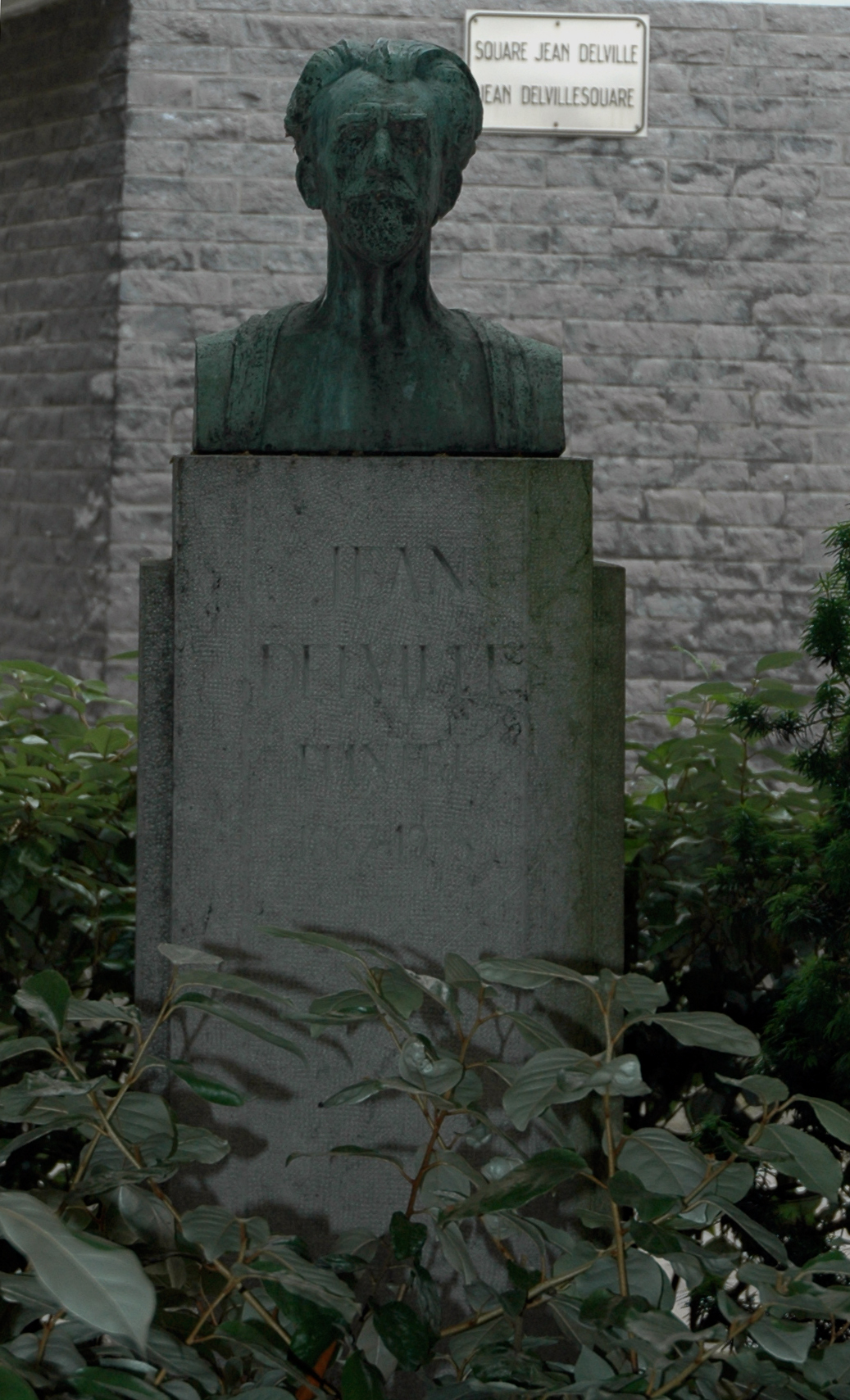
Memorial bust of Jean Delville, Avenue Sept Bonniers, Brussels, Belgium by sculptor Victor Demanet (1953; photo 2008).

From the 1920s onwards, Delville experienced a much more settled and successful career than ever before. With the highly successful completion of the two major public projects in the Palais de Justice and the Cinquantenaire, and his election as a member of the prestigious Belgian Royal Academy of sciences and letters in 1924, he seemed to have been drawn much closer into the Belgian establishment during these years. He maintained his post as Premier Professeur at the Academy of Fine Art in Brussels until 1937 and continued to paint until crippling arthritis in his right hand forced him to give up the brush in 1947.

His ambition to create large-scale Idealist works of art was sustained right up to the end of his painting career after the Second World War, notable examples amongst which include his Les Forces (1924, 55 × 800 cm, Palais de Justice), Les Dernières Idoles (1931, 450 × 300 cm, private collection) and La Roue du Monde (1940, 298 × 231 cm, Antwerp: Royal Museum of Fine Art). He was still able to sustain a power of expression and a highly articulate finish to his works in his later years that was there from the very start. However, a change in his style took place amongst some of his works in the 1930s, (especially while he was resident in Mons). Characteristically they became more pared-down in their articulation of form and colour: shapes became more stylised and geometric and his colours were more pallid, or 'pastel' in tone, lacking the energy, vibrant contrasts and rich tonalities that was characteristic of his work until then. His treatment of figures also became more stylised and he often articulated their facial features with characteristically 'almond'-shaped eyes, giving his figures an otherworldly appearance. Typical examples of this period include his Seraphitus-Seraphita (1932), Les Idées (1934), Le Dieu de la Musique (1937) and Pégase (1938).

Delville remained a committed and passionate Theosophist until his death in 1953 and he maintained in one of his biographies that this always formed the foundation to this moral and artistic perspective throughout his later life. Regarding this important aspect of his intellectual and spiritual life, he wrote in 1944:

French: En réalité, la philosophie occulte occupe le fond de ma pensée depuis bien des années ! Je pense avoir lu à peu près tout ce qui fut publié d’important sur les problèmes de l’invisible. ... Depuis, j’ai beaucoup cherché, étudié sur la nature des phénomènes psychiques. L’Etude des sciences occultes est à la base de ma vie intellectuelle et morale., lit. 'In fact, occult philosophy has been at the back of my mind for many years! I think I have read almost everything important that has been published on the problems of the invisible. ... Since then, I have researched and studied the nature of psychic phenomena. The study of occult sciences is the basis of my intellectual and moral life.'

On 19 January 1953 (73 years ago), his birthday, Delville died at the age of 86.

== Honours ==
- 1919 : Officer of the Order of the Crown.

== Theory and technique ==
=== Idealist theory ===
Delville wrote prolifically throughout his life outlining his Idealist aesthetic. His first main publication on the subject was his Mission de l'Art (1900). Delville's Idealist theory is a syncretic formulation of traditional Idealist thinking (in the tradition of Plato, Schopenhauer and Hegel) and contemporary esoteric philosophy. In summary, Delville believed that art is the expression of the Ideal (or spiritual) in material form and is founded on the principle of Ideal Beauty, in other words Beauty that is the manifestation of the Ideal, or spiritual realm, in physical objects. Contemplating objects that manifest Ideal Beauty allows us to perceive, if only fleetingly, the spiritual dimension and we are transfigured as a result.

Delville outlines this in a vivid passage in his La Mission de l'Art where he emphasises the expressive value of Idealist art, in other words, that it is not merely a question of engaging passively with the image, but it is also about feeling the 'energy' that it radiates, which uplifts and transforms the consciousness of the viewer, in a spiritual way. Idealism in art is, he writes, 'the introduction of Spirituality into Art'. For Delville, the Idea is an expression of the Ideal realm, and it is a living force within human experience that dwells within the transpersonal realm of human experience. He writes further that:

The Idea, in the metaphysical or esoteric sense, is Force, the universal and divine force which moves worlds, and its movement is the supreme rhythm whence springs the harmonious working of Life.

Where there is no thought, there is no life, no creation. The modern western world has become unconscious of this tremendous power of the Ideal, and Art inevitably has thus become degraded. This ignorance of the creative forces of thought has, nevertheless, obscured and diverted towards materialism all modern judgement. Materialism does not know how ideas and thoughts vibrate, and how these vibrations impinge on the consciousness of the individual.

And yet these vibrations, though invisible to the greater part of mankind, are able to exercise an astounding influence over the mentality of human beings, and thus assist in their evolution. Before works of genius the human consciousness receives mental and spiritual vibrations, which are generated by the force of the idea reflected. The more elevated, pure and sublime a work is, the more the inner being, coming into contact with the ideal vibrations emanated from it, will be raised, purified, and made sublime. The artist who is not ideal, that is to say, artist who does not know that every form must be the result of an idea, and that every idea must have its form, the artist, in short, who does not know that Beauty is the luminous conception of equilibrium in forms, will never have any influence over the soul, because his works will be really without thought, that is, without life.

The Idea is the emotion of the Spirit as Emotion is the reflex of the Soul.

Delville goes further by dividing his understanding of beauty into three categories: I) spiritual beauty: the source of beauty in physical objects, ii) formal beauty: the physical articulation of beauty in works of art, and iii) technical beauty: the specific execution of line, colour, light and shade, and composition to express Ideal beauty in physical objects and works of art. In French Delville referred to these terms as: La Beauté spirituelle, La Beauté plastique and La Beauté technique. Delville goes further to map his threefold conception of beauty onto his esoteric conception of the threefold nature of reality, consisting of the natural, human and divine realms, as well as the threefold nature of man as body (senses), soul (feeling) and mind (thought and spirituality). He writes:

The work of Idealist Art is therefore that which will harmonise in itself the three great Words of Life: the Natural, the Human and the Divine. To attain this degree of aesthetic balance, – which, I am happy to concede, is not within the reach of just anyone! – one must find within the work the purest idea on an intellectual level, the most beautiful form within the artistic realm, and the most perfect technique in terms of execution. Without an idea, a work misses its intellectual mission, without form, it misses its natural mission and, without technique, it misses its goal of perfection. … The veritable character of the work of Idealist Art can be identified from the balance reigning over its accomplishment, meaning that it does not let the essential terms of idea, art or technique prevail one over the other, but more likely according to relations proportional to their respective powers.

=== The Classical tradition ===
Delville believed that the purest expression of Idealist art was to be found in the Classical tradition of ancient Greek art and the High Renaissance. For him, Classical art was the purest expression of the spiritual in material form. Delville sought to reinterpret the Classical idiom in a contemporary context – to suit, in other words, his specific Idealist style of art that he was formulating during the 1890s – not simply, in other words, to copy or imitate classical modes of art. The expression of harmony and equilibrium, which he saw as an essential aspect of Classical art, were fundamental in the expression of the spiritual in natural forms. There is a mystical aspect to Delville's aesthetic, and idea of Ideal Beauty, when he wrote that:

The Beautiful, taken in its classical sense, is not an illusion. The Beautiful is the True manifested by the Idea in form. This is the highest goal that the artist must seek to attain … When the artist causes light to spring forth from darkness, beauty from ugliness, the pure from the impure, he reveals Truth to humanity, he reveals God. The Beautiful, the True, the Good are synonyms. It is the glory of Art to be able to make perceptible to human eyes the three mysteries which form a single one!

=== Idealist art ===
Delville developed a distinct style in his painting, which is unmistakable. His finished drawing and paintings are highly articulate and precise in the way he renders forms. However, his works are not overbearingly detailed, as is often found in realist art, but he manages to capture the essence of the forms he articulates using the simplest means possible. This is especially so in his approach to figures. In his l'Amour des Ames he outlines the figures using long, curvaceous contours, and their anatomy is only lightly suggested using gentle contrasts in light and shade; the effect is the expression of great beauty without being overbearingly sensual: a technique often seen in Renaissance frescos. Delville had a great imagination for colour and its use for expressive purposes. His colours are often vivid, almost visionary, most clearly seen in his Trésors de Sathan which is bathed in an atmosphere of luminous golds and yellows. In his L'Ange des Splendeurs he captures the effect of iridescent, diaphanous gold in the angel's drapery contrasting distinctly with the heavy earthiness of the natural details (animals, spiders, vegetation) at bottom right hand side. His Ecole de Platon is a paradigm of serenity in his use of muted, cool colours and pastel shades to emphasise the intellectual idyll of Plato's Akademos.

Delville very seldom painted landscapes, still life or portraits for their own sake, but often incorporated these in his figure paintings. Almost all of Delville's paintings focus on the human form as the bearer of the drama of his works. He was a master of the articulation of human anatomy which he used to express vividly his Idealist technique and ideas. The various ways he articulates the human form is key to understanding his artistic programme that he unveiled in his paintings throughout his career. This is especially the case in the rendering of lithe and supple male and female figures in his Les Trésors de Sathan, L'Amour des Ames and L'Ecole de Platon, or the highly expressive drawn, sinewy, almost emaciated forms in the lower part of his epic l'Homme-Dieu displaying the suffering and distress of the human condition; or in the highly muscular, Titanesque rendering of anatomy in his heroic figures in his Prométhée and Les Dernières Idoles.

== Practise: idealist artworks ==
=== Mysteriosa or The Portrait of Mrs. Stuart Merrill (1892) ===
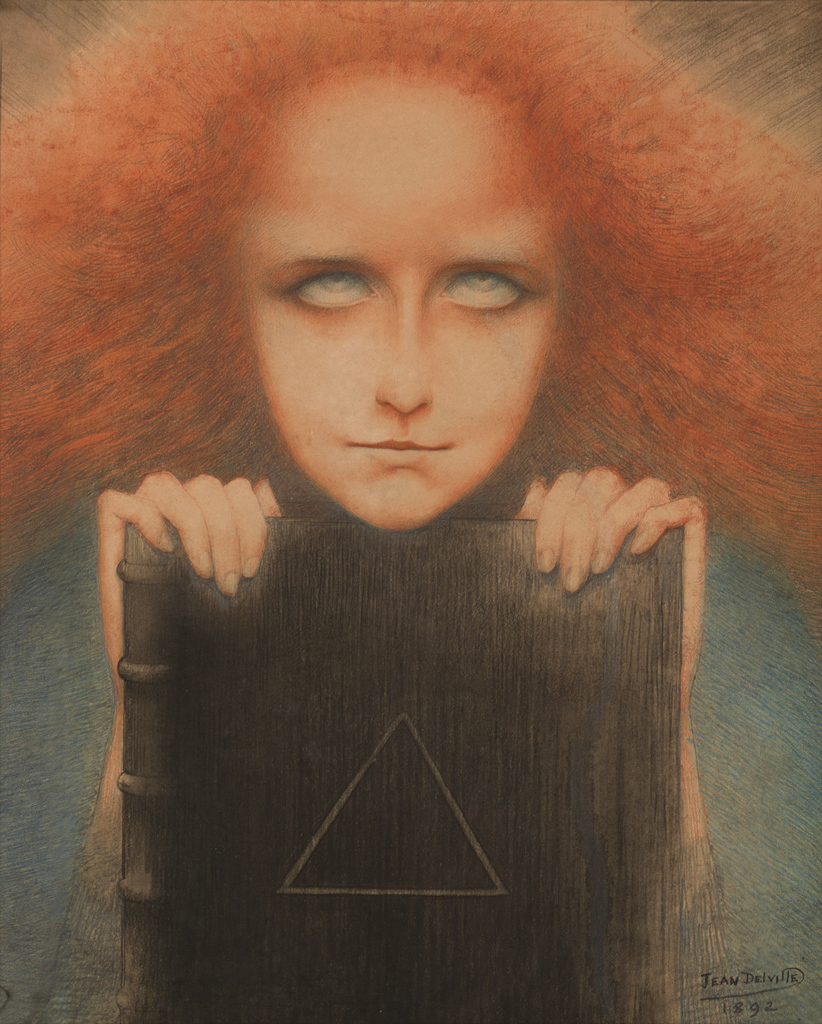
Mysteriosa or Portraite de Madame Stuart Merrill ("Mysteriosa or Portrait of Mrs. Stuart Merrill") by Jean Delville (1892).

Pencil, pastel and coloured pencil on paper, 40 x 32.1 cm, Brussels: Royal Museum of Fine Art.

Although Delville frequently wrote about his ideas, he almost never discussed his paintings. He left the interpretations to the viewer, and as a result his best pictures have an air of mystery and intrigue. One of the most mysterious is his portrait of Mrs. Stuart Merrill. This drawing, executed in chalks in 1892, is strikingly otherworldly. In it Delville depicts the young woman as a medium in trance, with her eyes turned upwards. Her radiating red-orange hair combines with the fluid light of her aura.

The hot colours which surround Mrs. Merrill's head appear to allude to the earthly fires of passion and sensuality. On the other hand, the book on which she rests her chin and long, almost spectral hands is inscribed with an upwards-pointing triangle. This represents Delville's idea of perfect human knowledge, achieved (as he says in his Dialogue), through magic, the Kabbalah and Hermeticism. As a number of authors have pointed out, the painting, with its references to occultism and wisdom seems to hint at initiation. If so, the woman's red aura might refer to her sensual side, which will become more spiritualised as she moves into a different stage of development.

Whatever its interpretation, this very unusual portrait has had a strong effect on viewers. It can be seen as eerie and supernatural (Bade, Femme Fatale, 1979), or as "a positively magical vision" (Jullian, Dreamers of Decadence, 1974). It is sometimes referred to as the Mona Lisa of the 1890s, and is also given the title La Mysteriosa. Today, few details are available about the sitter, and even her first name goes unmentioned in the literature. The most extensive information on her identity is given by Delville's son Olivier in his biography of the painter. It is not a first-hand account, however, as Olivier was born at least ten years after the picture was executed. According to him, Stuart Merrill (a Symbolist poet who published his works in Paris and Brussels) had a house near to the Delvilles in Forest at that time. Olivier adds that "the young Mrs Merrill-Rion" was a Belgian, and that Delville was struck by her strange beauty and depicted her with a mediumistic character. It is likely that Delville painted other portraits of Mrs Stuart Merrill and the 1893 drawing 'Medusa', in the same media is undoubtedly one of these.

The painting was not bought by the Merrills, and remained with the Delvilles until it was sold to a Californian private collector in the late 1960s. In 1998, it was acquired by the Brussels Museum of Fine Arts, and is now on display to the public.

=== The Angel of Splendour (L'Ange des Splendeurs, 1894) ===
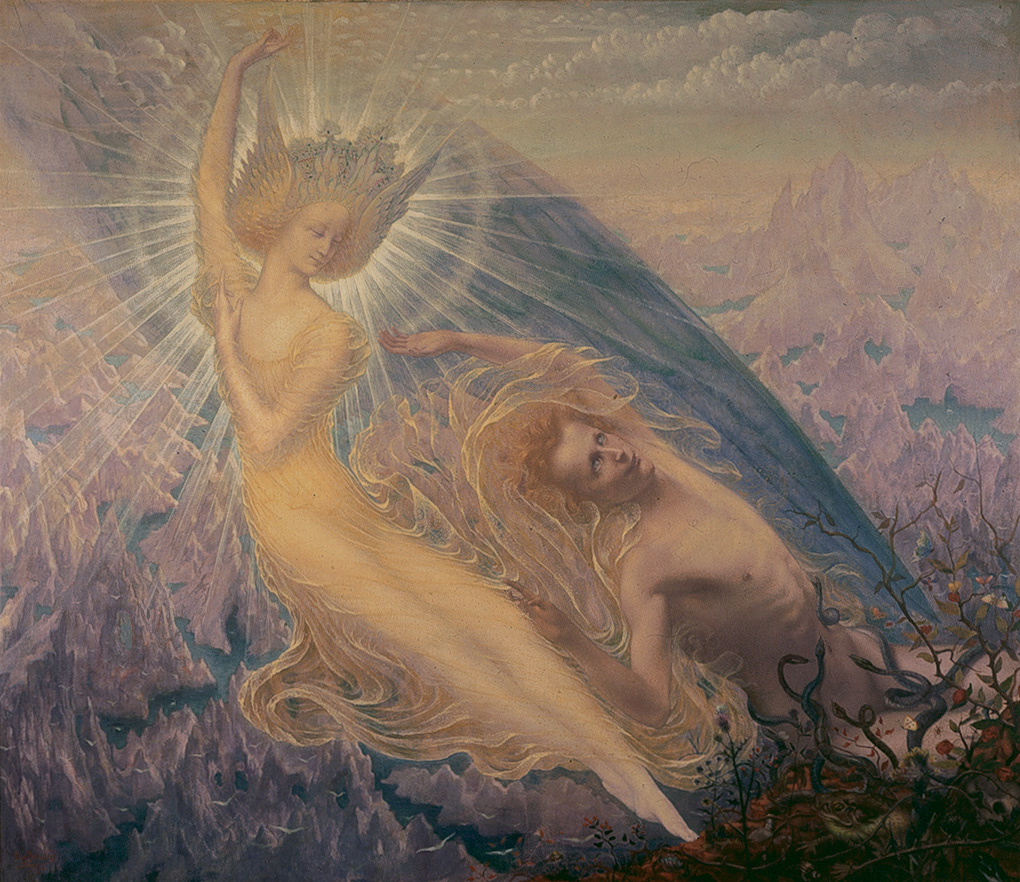
L’Ange des Splendeurs ("The Angel of Splendour") by Jean Delville (1894).

Oil in canvas, 127 x 146 cm, Brussels: Museum of Fine Art.

This is undoubtedly one of Delville's most visionary images of the early 1890s. The work refers to Delville's interests in the idea of initiation and the spiritualisation of the soul. As seen in many of his works, Delville often plays on the tension between opposites: light and dark, spirit and matter, Nature and the Ideal, etc. These ideas are personified in this work in the duality between the androgynous Angel and the young androgynous youth who is ensnared in the natural or material realm. His lower torso is engulfed in serpents and surrounded by toads, spiders, butterflies and other life-forms of the natural world. The Angel, on the other hand is a vision of diaphanous gold, clothed in a dress that is more fluid than material, emanating a soft, but intense, light. Her face is of the exquisite beauty commonly seen in Renaissance portraiture, notably in the work of Leonardo, whom Delville admired. The bright aureole that surrounds her face beaming light in all directions is a common signifier of her spiritual nature. Her proportions are odd, by human standards, and they were criticised by his contemporaries, but Delville understood that to humanise the angel would be to contradict her symbolic function in this work. She remains a being who is physically of her own, transcendental, realm. She points upwards indicating the path to the Ideal realm of spirit and beauty while the youth reaches towards her in an attempted gesture to release himself from the material snares that envelop him from below. There is an obvious tension here, as it is not entirely clear whether the youth will make it, or sink back into the deadening material realm from which he is emerging. The first step on the path of initiation and transcendence is to overcome and control the limitations of the illusory material dimension, and specifically to control the passions and desires, in order to clear the path for the transcendence of the soul. This painting is a totem of that moment in the initiatory drama that Delville expressed in many of his paintings and poems at the time.

=== Satan's Treasures (Les Trésors de Sathan, 1895) ===
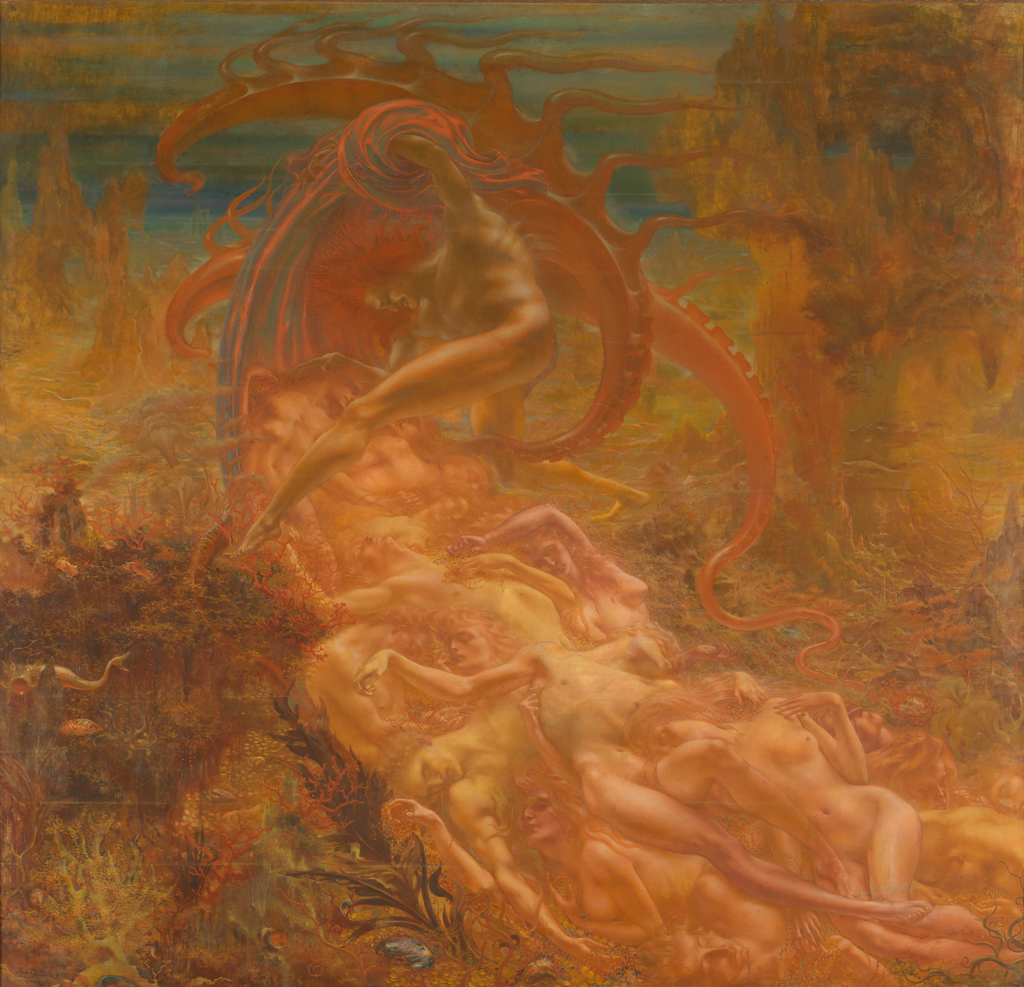
Les Trésors de Sathan ("Satan's Treasures") by Jean Delville (1895).

Oil on canvas, 258 x 268 cm, Brussels: Museum of Fine Art.

Delville exhibited his Trésors de Sathan (Satan's Treasures) at the Salon de Gand in September 1895 while he was working on his entry for the Belgian Prix de Rome. It was then exhibited in Brussels for the first time in 1896 at Delville's first Salon d'Art Idéaliste. This was one of Delville's first 'breakthrough' paintings and one of his most important works from his artistic period up to 1895.

On the whole, Delville's works generally deal with the theme of the duality between nature (human or otherwise) and the transcendental world. Delville was an Idealist, in other words, he believed in the reality of a transcendental or spiritual dimension as the basis of reality. Our perceptual material world is, in this world-view, seen merely an illusion that brings suffering and discontent. Our goal is to spiritualize our being and refine our material selves, which includes our desires and need for the fulfillment of material satisfaction. Without a spiritual context in mind, men and women simply become deadened materialistic entities always governed by their desires, passions, greed and ego-driven need for control and power over others. This is the realm of matter, or in Delville's cosmology, the realm of "Sathan" (spelled with an archaic h that is rarely preserved in translation), who controls and governs our lower state of being. Without a spiritual goal in life, we are merely slaves to Satan and are completely submissive to his power; we become his 'treasure' as is implied in the title of this painting. Here Delville depicts Satan as a rather attractive figure, beguiling, powerful and seductive, dragging the hapless mass of men and woman to his undersea lair. Significantly the figures are not in a state of pain or agony, as is usually the case in Western depictions of Satan's underworld. Here they appear to be in a state of reverie and bliss, unconscious of their lives and the value of the spiritual reality of their existence, and succumbing, rather, entirely to the lure of gold and sensual pleasure; in other words, material greed and sensualism that Delville saw as a trap and a catastrophic diversion from humanity's true goal which is to spiritualize one's being and enter the higher realm of consciousness and spiritual bliss which he referred to as the 'Ideal'.

The theme of exercising control over one's lower nature–erotic temptation and indulgence–was believed by Delville and his esoteric contemporaries (especially Joséph Péladan) to represent the first stage on the path of initiation. This was first suggested in Edouard Schuré's influential work The Great Initiates and outlined in a passage reconstructing the Egyptian initiatory trials. He recounts how the final trial is set to resist erotic temptation personified in the form of an alluring female figure.

Delville expressed these ideas in an article published in the contemporary journal Le Mouvement Littéraire in 1893:

Erotic fever has sterilized most minds. One ordinarily thinks of himself as virile because he satisfies a woman’s unquenched bestial desires. Well, that’s where the great shame of the cerebral degeneration of our time starts. The poet, the artist, the scientist are mostly attached to the spiritual functions rather than the emasculating animal functions. The real male is he whose mind can dominate the body and who only responds to solicitations of the flesh as his will allows. … if the works of the Sar, a virile man if ever there was one, energetically banish sexual conflicts, that is, are a consistent plea in favour of chastity, it is because he has studied the ravages of carnal love, because he has understood that one has to beware of the feelings of the heart, a heart in love being a dangerous accomplice of instinct. … Unfortunately, for the most part, we remain stubbornly ignorant of the fact that real virginity develops highly the powers of the soul, and that, to those who dedicate themselves to it, it imparts faculties unknown to the rest of the human race.

Delville's 1897 anthology of poems Frisson du Sphinx also has frequent references to "Sathan", such as his "Les Murmures de l’Ombre", "Tête d’Ombre", "La Tempête", and "l’Etoile Noire". The last example vividly evokes the motif that runs throughout Delville's writings:

"L'ÉTOILE NOIRE"

Du plus profond enfer du mal et du néant
l'on voit le noir éclat de l'astre satanique
darder sinistrement, comme en une panique,
ses néfastes rayons au coeur du mécréant.

Sathan brûle ce feu sombre des maléfices
pour fasciner les yeux coupables et damnés
et pour faire jaillir sur tous ceux qui sont nés
le chaos infernal des ténèbres complices.

Mêlant son despotisme à son absurdité,
contre le Beau, l'Amour, le Ciel, la Vérité,
c'est le mensonge haineux et la lourde ignorance.

O! vieil astre de mort, effroyable appareil,
vous êtes la nuit froide et la morne impuissance,
car le sang clair du Christ est l'âme du soleil!

"The Dark Star" (trans.)

From the deepest hell of evil and nothingness
one sees the dark glare of the satanic star
sinisterly shining, as in a panic,
its harmful rays of light into the heart of the unbeliever.

Sathan burns this dark fire of evil sorcery
to enthral every damned and guilty eye
and to spurt upon all those that are born
the infernal chaos of conniving darkness.

Mixing his despotism with absurdity,
of lies full of hatred and heavy ignorance,
against the Beautiful, Love, Heaven and Truth.

O! old star of death, device of horror,
you are but frigid night and dismal impotence,
for the limpid blood of Christ is the soul of the sun!

=== The School of Plato (L'Ecole de Platon, 1898) ===
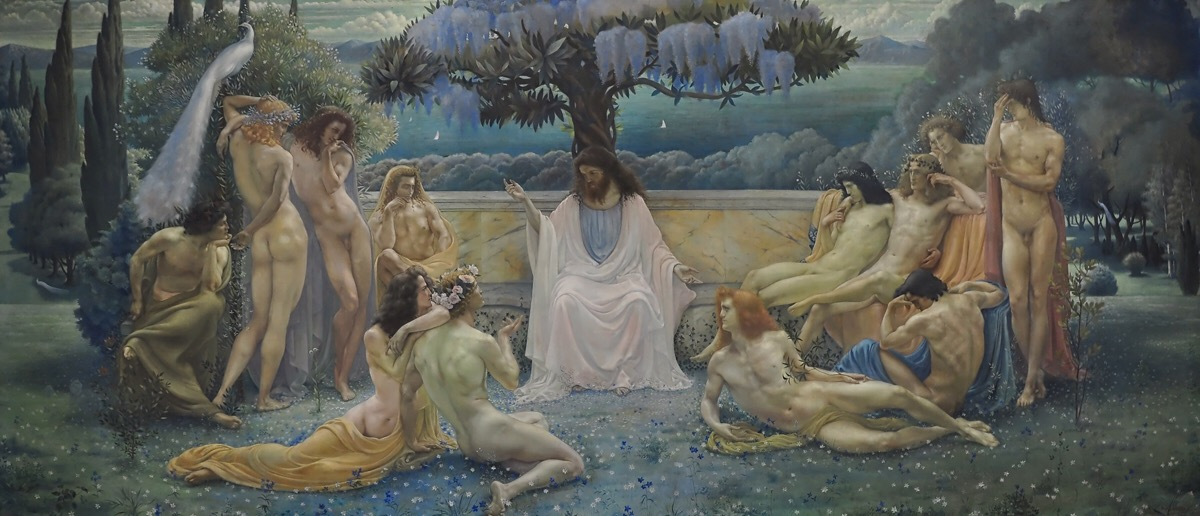
L’École de Platon ("The School of Plato") by Jean Delville (1898).

Oil on canvas, 260 x 605 cm, Paris: Musée d'Orsay.

In this important painting, Delville invokes the serene beauty of the Classical world and its aesthetic and philosophical principles. Delville painted this work while he was in Italy on his artistic sojourn there after winning the coveted Belgian Prix de Rome. Delville was then, at last, able to study the classical works of the Renaissance and the ancient world that profoundly influenced his artistic ideas.

The scale of the painting is impressive, measuring 2.60 metres high by 6.05 metres long, and Delville certainly had in mind large-scale academic history paintings which were the preserve of erudite artistic subjects painted in the Classical tradition, which he sought to renew. The figures depicted are almost life-size. The style of the painting is inspired by the Italian frescoes by Raphael and Michelangelo that Delville would have seen while in Rome, characterised by bold articuation of forms with a matte (as opposed to a glossy) finish. The painting was first exhibited at Delville's final Salon d'Art Idéaliste in Brussels in 1898. The work was universally praised as a masterpiece by his contemporaries. The leading avant-garde art journal L'Art Moderne, which was frequently hostile towards Delville and his art, praised his work in the following: 'Jean Delville ... has created a Work! A superb work of art: The School of Plato, to which he refers as "an essay in Fresco" – Go and see it! It is of a calm, a serene, a grand and delicious Beauty ... Ideal, yes, truly ideal. The programme shows his worth and it is magnificent.... It is beautiful, beautiful, beautiful!

Delville was immersed in studying the esoteric tradition and the hidden philosophies that were popular at the time. This was a tradition that extolled the virtues of self-improvement and spiritual progress through initiation. Edouard Schuré already identified Plato as one of the 'Great Initiates', in other words, light-bearers who guide humanity towards higher consciousness and deeper spiritual awareness during our earthly incarnation. Plato taught of the essential duality between the material and metaphysical dimensions; his gesture, pointing upwards and downwards, alludes to this duality between macrocosm and microcosm. Attainment of the Ideal realm and the expression of its truths in physical form was the key notion in Delville's aesthetic philosophy. He wrote often that the goal of art should aspire towards expressing Absolute, or Spiritual Beauty in physical form. He saw Classical art as the purest expression of this goal and he sought a revival of this idea in art, reworking it in a way that was appropriate for his contemporary cultural era. For Delville, moreover, the human body, was the purest expression of Ideal and Spiritual Beauty. He therefore often resorted to the depiction of nude male and female figures in his art as vehicles for the expression of this ideal, as is clearly seen in this work. Concerning the spiritual importance of the nude as a vehicle for the expression of a spiritual ideal, he wrote:

The nude has the high quality of being synthetic and universal. … in evoking Mankind, it evokes Humanity and all the beauty of Life, not life as we modern beings understand it, comprising nerves, morbid fevers and agitation, but the great universal life, which enriches the spirit and the earth, makes stars and souls resplendent and makes space vibrate, which beats in substance as in essence, which rules and moves the Universe, the beings and the objects, mortal or immortal, in the infinite rhythm and the mystery of Eternity, divine macrocosm and human microcosm where Universal Beauty, made of Love, Wisdom and Light, shines and is reflected forever.

The men in this painting are conceived in an idealised androgynous form: a concept that Delville, following Péladan, developed to express the ideal of a non-erotic perfection of the human state that synthesises the male and female principle in an idea of wholeness and perfection, which emulates the original state of human perfection that precedes our split, dual experience of reality in our earthly incarnation.

=== The Love of Souls (L'Amour des Ames, 1900) ===
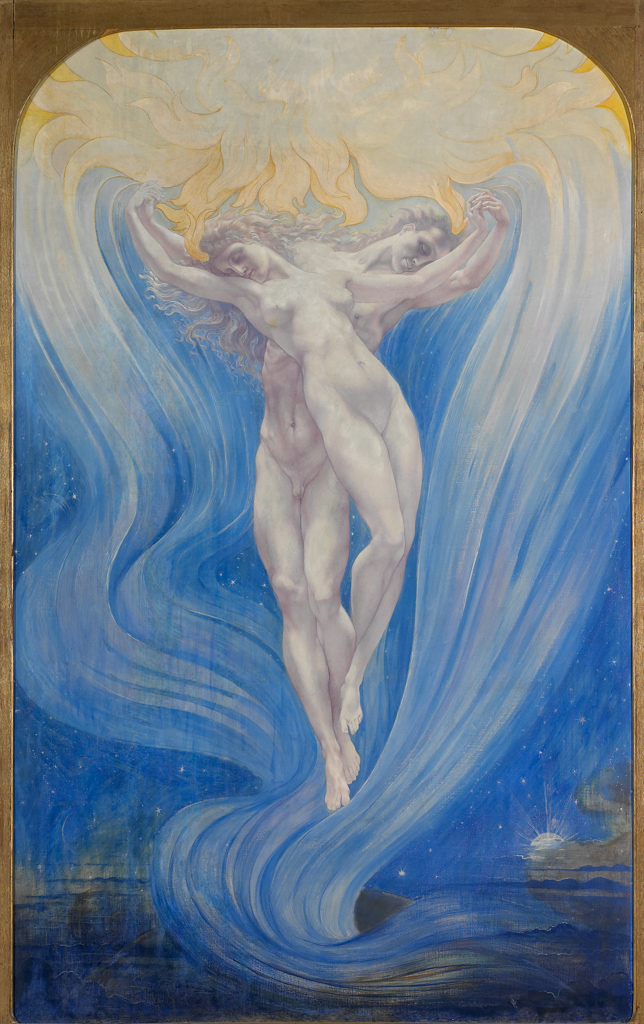
L’Amour des âmes ("The Love of Souls") by Jean Delville (1900).

Tempera and oil on canvas, 268 x 150 cm. Brussels: Musée communal des beaux-arts d'Ixelles.

This is undoubtedly one of Delville's most subtly articulated and beautiful images of the period. Delville depicts the union of souls, male and female, in a cosmic setting. This painting suggests a theme important to Delville and his contemporaries regarding the return to unity in the dual male and female principles of human experience that results in spiritual androgyny. Male energy and female energy are united to form a state of wholeness and complete unity of Being. It is a cosmic conception of the goal of existence, beyond opposites, polarity and discord. This state signifies a return to the original state of perfection and integration of opposites that unites us to the Cosmic mind, beyond time and space and the duality of physical and material existence. This spiritual union gives birth to the transcendent being, the cosmic Christ within. Delville often wrote of the nature of duality and the forces of opposites, as well as the need to bring these into harmony, in other words achieving Equilibrium. In fact, he understood the experience of opposition in nature (human as well as in the natural world) as an underlying 'law' relating to what he termed the 'Equilibrium in the Universal Order', with regard to which, he wrote:

In spite of a contrary appearance, all the forces, all the manifestations of nature influence each other with currents of negative polarity and positive polarity, undeniable astral influences. … The great contrasts of life, however, are responsible for all the misery, all the hardship; are they responsible for the production of Chaos? A huge mistake: The Great and the Small, the Strong and the Weak, the High and the Low, the Active and the Passive, the Full and the Empty, the Weighty and the Dense, Exterior and Interior, the Visible and the Invisible, the Beautiful and the Ugly, the Good and the Bad, Essence and Substance, Spirit and Matter are divergent forces which eternally constitute the great Equilibrium in the Universal Order. It is a Natural Law, and no philosophy, no dogma, no doctrine will ever prevail over It.

The setting of this work is important. Delville places the figures in an indeterminate, cosmic setting, suggesting that they are not figures that have human substance, but are rather symbols of the transcendent spiritual nature of man and woman. The ribbons of colour surrounding them suggests a fluid energy field upon which they are buoyed, an idea that Delville and his contemporaries often referred to as 'astral light' – an energy-force that animates living entities, much like the idea of 'the field' in quantum physics.

Delville painted this work in tempera, where pigments are mixed with egg white to create a luminous finish and a highly durable work of art. He was highly influenced by the artists of the Italian Renaissance who often used tempera in their works, and which, to this day, retain their purity of colour and luminosity to a high degree. The close-up details reveal his technique of applying the paint in small strokes; rather than blending the colours on the palette, they are blended by the eye. To achieve this effect one has to be highly skilled as a draughtsman.

== Character ==
In his biography, Delville's son Olivier tells us that his father, determined to pass his ideals on to the world, was continually painting and writing. He supplemented this unreliable income by teaching art, but his busy professional life did not prevent him from applying his strongly held beliefs to his personal life. Olivier describes his father as a person of courage, perseverance, probity and intellect, as well as an upright family man who was strict with his six children.

== Legacy ==
Delville is still not nearly as well known as some of his contemporaries of the Symbolist era. There are historical reasons for this. For instance, he never exhibited at the main exhibition societies in Brussels during the early part of his career, such as Les XX and La Libre Esthétique. The reputations of many of his contemporaries, like Khnopff, Mellery and Ensor, were largely founded on their participation at these societies, which promoted heavily their art through organised marketing campaigns, and by establishing a commercial network of dealers and collectors to invest in the art exhibited there. They were also very successful in making their art well known internationally. There was an overt commercial element associated with these societies in the way they created an aura about the art exhibited there as a desirable commodity. Delville shunned the commercialisation of art and the way it was manufactured as an elite commodity. Although he sold works at his own societies, such as Pour l'Art and the Salons d'Art Idéaiste, their purpose was mainly to create a forum for artists working in an idealist vein. Delville was mainly committed to using art as a force to transform society and to improve the lives of those around him. He wrote: 'there will be nothing to prevent art increasingly to become an educative force in society, conscious of its mission. It is time to penetrate society with art, with the ideal and with beauty. Today's society tends to fall increasingly into instinct. It is saturated with materialism, sensualism and ... commercialism'.

Delville believed, rather, that a respiritulaisation of society would be a redeeming path to rescue it from the morbidity of materialism. Elsewhere he wrote: 'Idealism ... has a universalizing educational and social impact ... Idealism sees humanity in terms of the immense vitality of his ideal future. In order for the artist to become aware of this, it is necessary for him to purify and elevate himself. ... The role of modern idealism will be to draw the artistic temperament away from the deadly epidemics of materialism ... and finally to guide him towards the purified regions of an art that is the harbinger of future spirituality.'

Delville remained desperately poor during the early part of his career and his condition was only occasionally relieved by the stipend associated with the Prix de Rome that he won as well as his employment at the Glasgow School of Art, and later the Ecole des beaux-arts. Delville never sold to dealers and only very seldom took on private commissions for portraits (a genre he would have excelled in). Most of his paintings were on a grand scale and he devised these mostly to be exhibited in public spaces, following his ideal of the social role of art. Thus, the poor reputation associated with Delville's art is in part probably related to the lack of any committed exposure and sustained marketing of his work, which was essential in forging the reputations of the early avant garde and afterwards. Delville also came from a working-class background which was a huge disadvantage in the contemporary bourgeois-dominated culture in Belgium. This would certainly have contributed to the erasure of his worth as an artist over time. Finally, Delville was fiercely independent in his approach to promoting his ideas and artistic ideals, seldom bending to the will of what was popular or acceptable in conservative bourgeois circles that controlled and dominated the art market during his formative years. Mainstream critics and peers generally shunned his art and ideals as a result. Despite his immense talent and vision, Delville remained a 'voice in the wilderness' during this time. This reputation persisted during the course of his life and afterwards as well.

Another great disadvantage related to Delville's reputation relates to the limited exposure of his major works in public museums, and the relative paucity of published material (until recently) concerning Delville's art and career. The Museum of Fine Art in Brussels houses by far more works than any public collection, but few of these are on public display. This is also the case in other centres in Belgium (Bruges and Antwerp, for example). Few of his works are to be seen in major museums outside Belgium, with the exception of his l'Ecole de Platon in the Musée d'Orsay in Paris. Many of his smaller works have long since disappeared or have been destroyed, which leaves conspicuous lacunae in his catalogue of extant works. The loss of major paintings like his Cycle passionnel and La Justice à travers les âges, amongst others also diminishes the impact of his known oeuvre. Moreover, a great number of his works are in private collections and their whereabouts still needs to be determined. This all means that access to his works is extremely limited and they remain out of the 'public eye', and hence the collective imagination generally. Reproductions of some of his paintings and drawings are available on the Internet, but are usually of poor quality which reduces their impact considerably. Finally, until very recently, there have been no major studies or monographs on the artist's work, which until now has left considerable gaps in the understanding of his life, art and ideas.

Despite this, a resurgence of interest in his work and ideas appears to be taking place, notably with the recent important retrospective exhibition in Namur that brought together many important paintings and drawings, many of which have not been seen before in public since they were first exhibited in the nineteenth century. Several Belgian and English art historians, working in collaboration with Delville's heirs and estate, are also taking a renewed interest in Delville's work, revealing detailed aspects of his life and work for the first time through detailed studies and monographs on aspects of Delville's life and art (see 'Sources').

== Selected works of art ==
=== Prints and drawings ===
- L'Agonie de Cachaprès (1887), charcoal on paper, 33 x 34.5 cm. Brussels: Musée d'Ixelles, inv. CL240
- Orphée Mort (1893), pencil and charcoal on paper, 41.7 x 43.1 cm. Private Collection.
- Tristan et Yseult (1887), pencil and charcoal on paper, 44.3 x 75.4 cm. Brussels: Royal Museums of Fine Arts of Belgium, inv. 7927.
- Le Dernier Sommeil (1888), charcoal, 44 x 57 cm. Private collection (Portrait of his grandmother on her death bed)
- Mendiants à Paris (1888), pencil on paper, 48.2 x 66.2 cm. Tournai: Musée des beaux-arts.
- Les Las d'Aller (1890), pencil on paper, 8.7 x 10.7 cm. Tournai: Musée des Beaux-arts.
- study for Le Cycle des passions, (1890), Brussels: Royal Museums of Fine Arts of Belgium.
- Allégorie de l'enfer (Azraël), (1890). Private collection.
- Parsifal (1890), charcoal on paper, 70.7 x 56 cm. Private collection.
- L'Idole de la perversité (1891), pencil on paper, 98.5 x 56.5 cm. Private collection.
- La Méduse (1891), pencil, ink and mixed media, 15.2 x 35.6 cm. Chicago: Chicago Institute of Art.
- Portrait de Madame Stuart Merrill or Mysteriosa, pastel, (1892), pencil and coloured pastel on paper, 40 x 32.1 cm. Brussels: Royal Museums of Fine Arts of Belgium, inv. 12029.

=== Paintings ===
- La Coulée d'acier (1886)
- L'Affamé (1887), oil on canvas, 80x100 cm. Private collection (recently rediscovered).
- La Symbolisation de la Chair et de l'Esprit (1890), location unknown.
- La Morte d'Orphée (1893), oil on canvas, 79.3 x 99.2 cm. Brussels: Royal Museums of Fine Arts of Belgium, inv. 12209.
- Le Christ glorifié par les enfants (1894), oil on canvas, 222 x 247 cm. Antwerp: Academy of Fine Arts (Prix de Rome entry).
- L'Ange des Splendeurs (1894), oil on canvas, 127 x 146 cm. Brussels: Royal Museums of Fine Arts of Belgium, inv. GC179.
- Portrait du grand maître de la Rose-Croix, Joséphin Péladan en habit de chœur, 1894, oil on canvas, 242 x 112 cm. Nîmes: musée des Beaux-arts
- Les Trésors de Satan, 1895, oil on canvas, 258 x 268 cm. Brussels: Royal Museums of Fine Arts of Belgium, inv. 4575.
- L'Oracle à Dodone (1896), oil on canvas, 118 x 170 cm. Private collection.
- L'École de Platon, (1898), oil on canvas, 260 x 605 cm. Paris: Musée d'Orsay, inv. RF1979-34.
- L'Amour des âmes (1900), tempera and oil on canvas, 268 x 150 cm. Brussels: Musée communal des beaux-arts d'Ixelles, inv. 1942.
- Homme-Dieu, (1903), oil on canvas, 500 x 500 cm. Bruges: Groeningemuseum.
- Prométhée (1907), oil on canvas, 500 x 250 cm. Brussels: Université Libre de Bruxelles.
- La Justice à travers les âges, (1911–1914) Palais de Justice, Brussels; destroyed by German bombing at the end of WWII
- L'Oubli des passions (1913), oil on canvas, 169 x 146 cm. Private collection.
- Le Génie vainqueur (1914/18), oil on canvas, 460 x 350 cm (?). Brussels: Palais de Justice.
- La Belgique indomptable (1916), oil on canvas, 177 x 127 cm. Location unknown.
- Portrait de la femme de l'artiste, (1916). Brussels: Royal Museums of Fine Arts of Belgium.
- Sur l'autel de la patrie (1918), oil on canvas, 305 x 205. Brussels, Royal Academy of Fine Art.
- Les Mères (1919), oil on canvas, 112 x 144 cm. Dinant: City collection, inv. 203.
- Dante buvant les eaux de Léthé (1919), 142 x 179 cm. Private collection.
- L’Ange Musicien or the Allegory of Music (1922), 56 x 66,5 cm. Private collection.
- Les forces (1924), oil on canvas, 500 x 800 cm. Brussels: Palais de la Justice.
- Hélène, le fille du Cyne (1928), oil on canvas, 205 x 135 cm. Private collection.
- L'Ecole du Silence (1929), oil on canvas, 180 x 153 cm. Taiwan: Chi Mei Museum.
- Les ténebrès à la lumière (1929), oil on canvas, 205.5 x 93.5 cm. Private collection.
- Le dieu vaincu par l'amour (1930). Private collection
- Les Femmes d'Eleusis (1931), oil on canvas, 110 x 140 cm. Tournai: Musée des Beaux-arts.
- Le Secret de la Tombe (1931), oil on canvas, 135 x 195 cm. Private collection.
- Les dernières idoles (1931), oil on canvas, 450 x 300 cm. Private collection
- Seraphitus-Sepraphita (1932), oil on canvas, 187 x 103 cm. Private collection.
- L'Extase de Danté (1932), oil on canvas, 159 x 53.5. Private collection.
- Le rêve de l'amour (1933), triptych, oil on canvas, 133 x 298 cm. Private collection.
- Le Christ en Deuil (1933), oil on canvas, 200 x 215 cm. Private collection.
- Les Idées (1934), oil on canvas, 210 x 280 cm. Private collection.
- La Libération (1936), oil on canvas, 180 x 250 cm. Private collection.
- Le Dieu de la Musique (1937), oil on canvas, 240 x 146 cm. Brussels: Conservatoire Royale.
- Le voile de la nuit (1937), oil on canvas, 168 x 127. Private collection.
- Les quatres Kumaras (1938), oil on canvas, 112 x 56 cm. Private collection.
- Pegasus (1938), oil on canvas, 114 x 95 cm. Mons: Musée de Beaux-arts de Belgique, inv. 285.
- Le Fléau or La Force (1940), oil on canvas, 135 x 194 cm, Brussels: Galerie Uzal.
- La Roue du monde (1940), oil on canvas, 298 x 231.1 cm. Antwerp: Royal museum of Fine Art, inv. 2607.
- Les ames errantes (1942), oil on canvas, 150 x 330 cm. Private collection.
- La vision de la Paix (1947), oil on canvas, 100 x 120 cm, private collection

== Published works ==
=== Books ===
Title page of Jean Delville's La Mission de L'Art (1900).

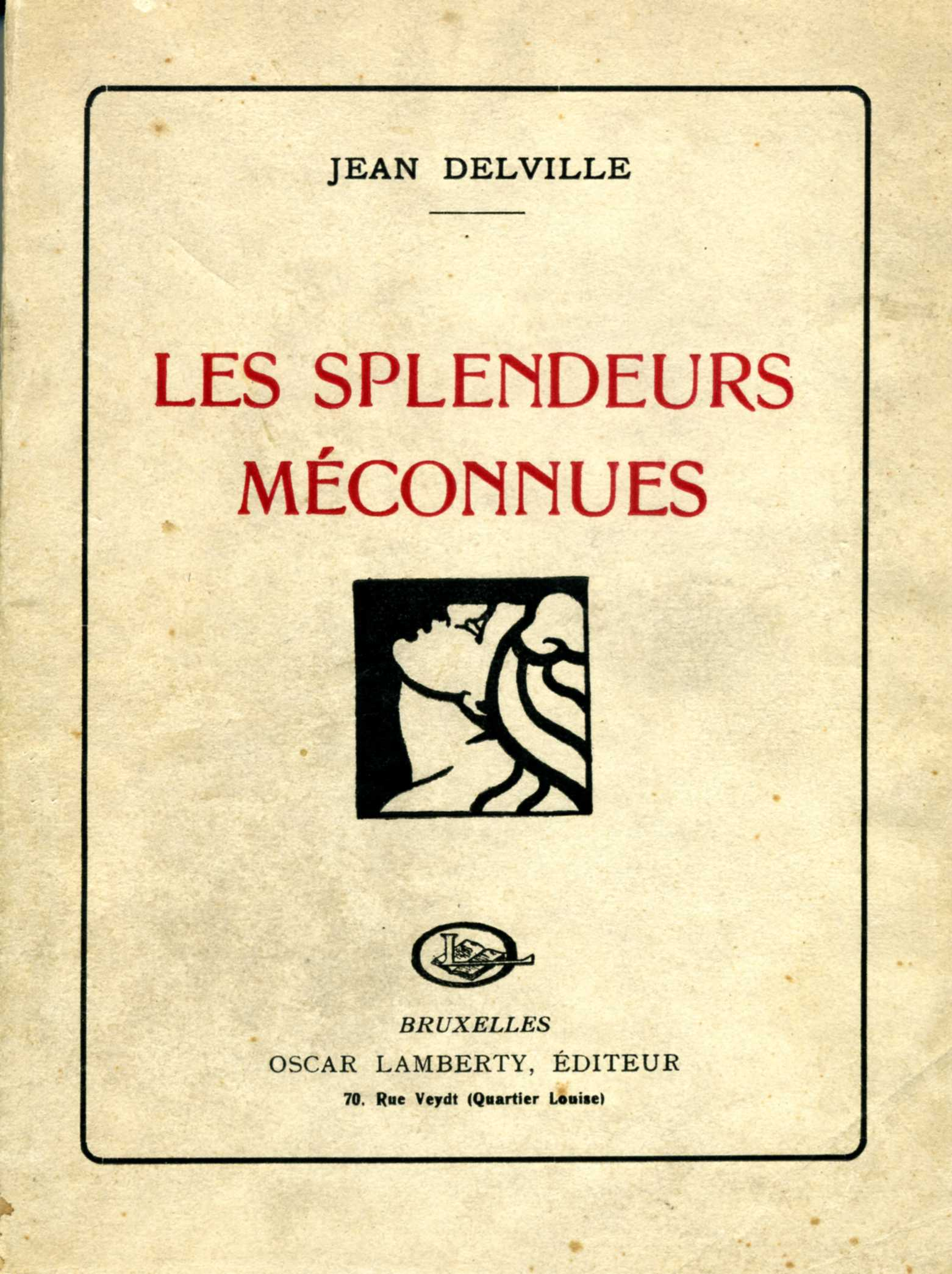
Cover of Delville's third poetry anthology Les Splendeurs Méconnues (1922).

- Le Sens de la Vie (n.d.).
- L’Idéal Messianique (n.d.)
- Dialogue Entre Nous. Argumentation Kabbalistique, Occultiste, Idéaliste (Bruges: Daveluy Frères, 1895).
- La Mission de l’Art. Etude d’Esthétique Idéaliste. Préface d’Edouard Schuré (Bruxelles: Georges Balat, 1900).
- Le Mystère de l’Évolution ou de la Généalogie de l’Homme d’après la Théosophie (Bruxelles: H. Lamertin, (1905).
- Problèmes de la Vie Moderne (Brussels: "En Art", 1905).
- Dieu en Nous. Essai Théosophique d’Emancipation Spirituelle. Conférence Faite à la Branche Centrale Belge de la Société Théosophique (Brussels: c.1905).
- Le Christ Reviendra, Le Christ en Face de l’Eglise et de la Science (Paris : Editions Théosophiques, 1913).
- Discours prononcé par M. Jean Delville, Professeur, à l’occasion de la Distribution des Prix de l’Année 1921–1922, Ville de Bruxelles:Académie Royale des Beaux-Arts et Ecole des Arts Décoratifs (Brussels: E Guyot, 1923).
- La Grande Hiérarchie Occulte et la Venue d’un Instructeur Mondial (Bruxelles: Les Presses Tilbury, 1925).
- Considérations Sur L’Art Moderne, Ledeberg-Gand, Imprimerie Jules de Vreese, 1926 (Extrait du Bulletin Des Commissions Royales d’Art & d’Archéologie LXV e Année, 1926).
- Krishnamurti, Révélateur des Temps Nouveaux (Brussels: Office de Publicité, 1928).
- La Création d’un Conseil Supérieur des Beaux-Arts. Voeu de la Classe de Beaux-Arts de l’Académie Royale de Belgique (Brussels: Lamertin, 1935).

=== Poetry anthologies ===
- Les Horizons Hantés (Brussels: 1892).
- Le Frisson du Sphinx (Brussels: H Lamertin, 1897).
- Les Splendeurs Méconnues (Brussels: Oscar Lamberty, 1922).
- Les Chants dans la Clarté (Brussels: à l’enseigne de l’oiseau bleu, 1927).

== Recent exhibitions ==
- 2015. Stone Bell House, City Art Gallery, Prague. Exhibition drawing on works exhibited in Namur in 2014.
- 2014. Small, but important, exhibition of representative works by Delville.

== Popular culture ==
Swedish thrash metal band Hexenhaus used the painting Les Trésors de Sathan for the cover of their album A Tribute to Insanity (1988), while American death metal group Morbid Angel also used it for the cover of their second album, Blessed Are the Sick (1991). The painting is also quoted and described in Alan Moore's comic Providence (Avatar Press) (issue three of twelve).

== See also ==
- Salon de la Rose + Croix

== Bibliography ==
- Brendan Cole, Jean Delville, Art between Nature and the Absolute, Newcastle: Cambridge Scholars Publishing, 2015.
- Brendan Cole, 'Jean Delville and the Belgian Avant-Garde : Anti-Materialist Polemics for 'un art annonciateur des spiritualités futures', in Rosina Neginsky (ed.), Symbolism. Its Origins and Its Consequences, Newcastle: Cambridge Scholars Publishing, 2010, pp. 129–146.
- Miriam Delville, 'Jean Delville, mon grand-père' in Laoureux, et al. Jean Delville, Maître de l'idéal, Paris: Somogy éditions d'art, 2014, pp. 14–36.
- Olivier Delville, Jean Delville, peintre, 1867–1953, Brussels: Laconti, 1984.
- Michel Draguet (ed.), Splendeurs de l’Idéal. Rops, Khnopff, Delville et leur temps. Liège: Musée de l’Art wallon, du 17 octobre décembre 1997.
- Donald Flanell Friedman, « L’évocation du Liebestod par Jean Delville », in La Peinture (d)écrite, Textyles, n° 17–18. Bruxelles: Le Cri Édition, 2000, pp. 79–84.
- Denis Laoureux, et al., Jean Delville (1867–1953) Maitre de l'idéal. Paris: Somogy éditions d'art, 2014.
- Francine-Claire Legrand, Le Symbolisme en Belgique Brussels: Laconti, 1971.
- Francine-Claire Legrand, 'Jean Delville peintre Idéaliste', in Olivier Delville, Jean Delville, peintre, 1867–1953, Brussels: Laconti, 1984, pp. 62–94.
