= Rose-Croix =

Rose-Croix, Rose Cross or Rosenkreuz may refer to:

- Rose Cross, an esoteric symbol associated with rosicrucianism
- Rosicrucianism, a spiritual and cultural movement which arose in Europe in the 17th century
- Christian Rosenkreuz, the legendary or allegorical founder of the Rosicrucian Order
- Rose+Croix Journal, a publication of the Ancient Mystical Order Rosae Crucis
- Salon de la Rose + Croix, a series of Symbolist art salons hosted in Paris during the 1890s
- Scottish Rite, one of several Rites of Freemasonry
- The Rosenkreuz Orden, a fictional organization, the main antagonist in Trinity Blood, a Japanese series of novels published in 2001–2004
