= Demanet =

Demanet or Démanet is a surname. Notable people with the surname include:

- Lucien Démanet (1874–1943), French gymnast
- Victor Demanet, Belgian sculptor
