= Salon de la Rose + Croix =

1890s Parisian art and music salons

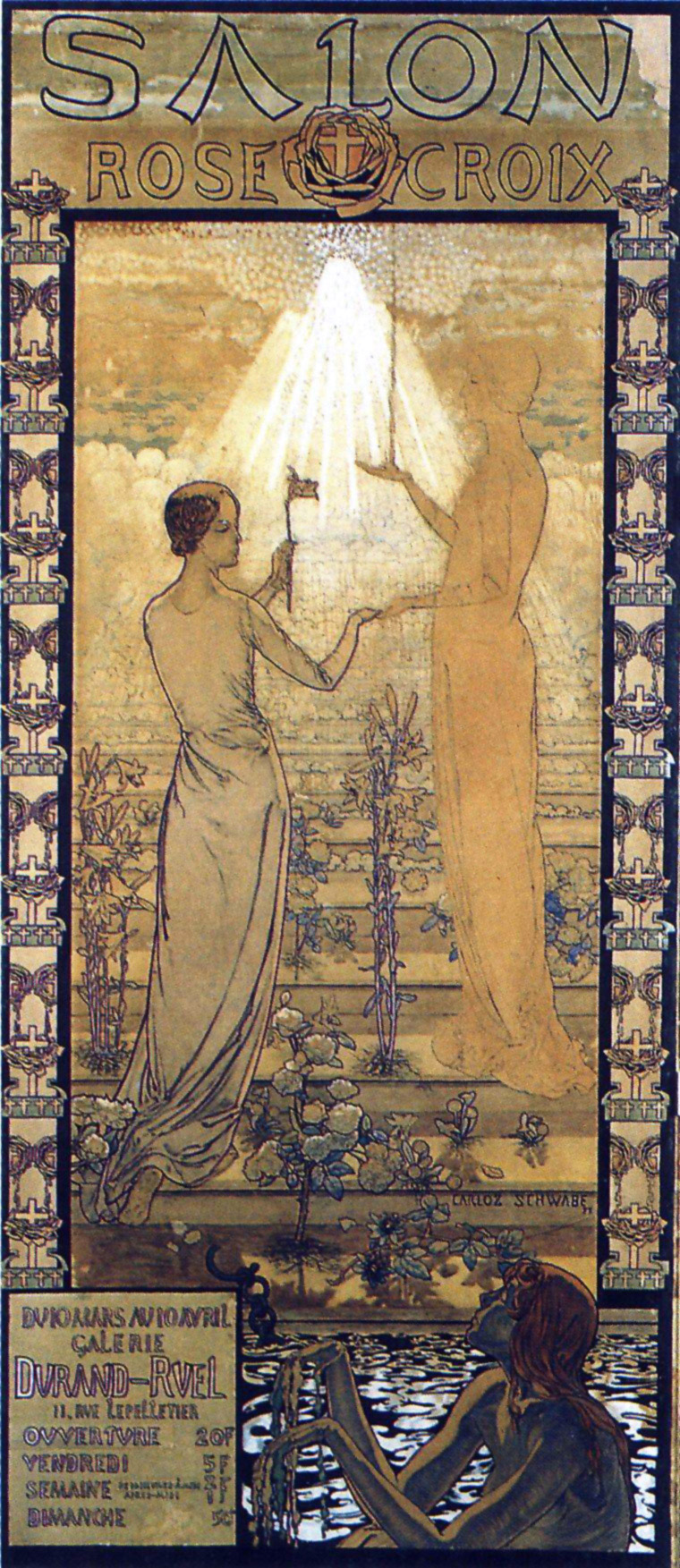
Promotional poster for Josephin Péladan's Salon de la Rose + Croix.

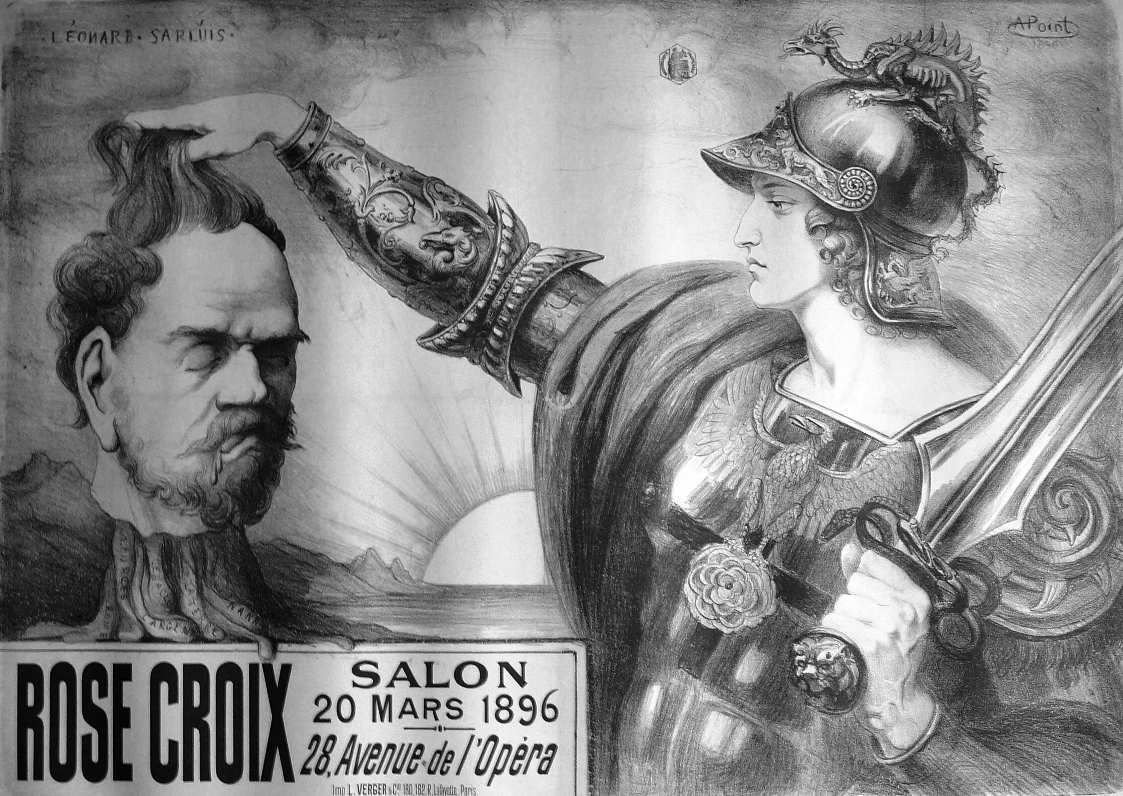
Poster for the fifth Salon de la Rose + Croix, 1896, depicting Perseus holding the severed head of Émile Zola. Designed by Armand Point and Sarreluys.

The Salon de la Rose + Croix was a series of six art and music salons hosted by Joséphin Péladan in 1890s Paris. The Salon de la Rose + Croix grew out of Péladan's Mystic Order of the Rose + Croix, a cultic religious art movement that he established in Paris. The avant-garde Salon artists included many of the prominent Symbolist painters, writers, and music composers of the period.

== History ==
French culture experienced a revival of intellectual interest in Roman Catholic religion during the fin de siècle period. While some intellectuals became anti-religious, others explored cultic religious practises and organized themselves into groups along the lines of Roman Catholic sects, with beliefs and practices outside the mainstream of orthodox Catholicism. One such following was established by Josephin Péladan, who was fascinated with Medieval Rosicrucian secret society. Péladan called his movement the Mystic Order of the Rose + Croix, and named himself High Priest, or Sâr, of the Order. Péladan's Order has also been described as an occult movement.

Central to Péladan's doctrine was the promotion of the arts "especially of an esoteric flavour", hoping to "overcome European materialism". The main project of the Order was the organization of a series of art, literary, and music salons, the Salon de la Rose + Croix. There were six salons in total, held between 1892 and 1897. The poster for the fifth salon (1896), designed by Armand Point and Sarreluys, depicted Perseus holding the severed head of Émile Zola, in reference to the mythological story in which Perseus did the same to the Gorgon Medusa. Around 230 artists in total presented their works at the salons. Péladan wanted the Salon to create a forum for artists who rejected the officially approved academic art being exhibited by the Académie des Beaux-Arts, and the influential Impressionists. Péladan was a prolific art critic, publishing condemnations of the major contemporary art scene in Paris. He lauded artists whose work included mystic and idealistic aspects. The Salon gave him a way to put his cult beliefs into practise in the art world, with the goal of affecting change in the mainstream approach to art subjects.

Péladan was clear about how he wanted to focus the works presented at the Salon. Subjects deemed thematically appropriate had to be overtly connected to religion and mysticism. Legends and myths, dreams, and allegory, were all considered suitable for the Salon, and the Symbolist painters were strongly associated with the Salon. Works that dealt with modern life, naturalist landscapes, realism, or decadence were not included in the Salon. Some major influences on Péladan were Arthurian legends, Italian Renaissance ideals and styles, the poetry of Edgar Allan Poe and Charles Baudelaire, and the music of Richard Wagner.

== Impact ==
The Salon de la Rose + Croix was vital in promoting works of the Symbolist movement, although many important non-Symbolist works were also presented. Among the most influential works included at the Salon were the "Gothic fantasies" of painter Arnold Böcklin, the music of Erik Satie, painters Fernand Khnopff, Ferdinand Hodler, Jan Toorop, Gaetano Previati, Jean Delville, Carlos Schwabe, and Charles Filiger. Not all Symbolist artists were enthusiastic about Péladan's Order and his Salon. Gustave Moreau and Odilon Redon rejected Péladan's doctrines and preferred a different, progressive approach.

Péladan was a tireless and creative publicist for his movement and for the Salon in particular. The press and the public both flocked to the Salon's exhibitions when they were held. Péladan was as well known as his Salon, and his controversial personality may have overshadowed the Salon, leaving a more lasting impression. Although the Salon was popular with the public when it was held, the Symbolist movement failed to develop into a dominant trend in art.

== See also ==
- Expressionism
- Post-Impressionism
- Rosicrucianism
- Symbolism (arts)
