= Charles Filiger =

French painter (1863–1928)

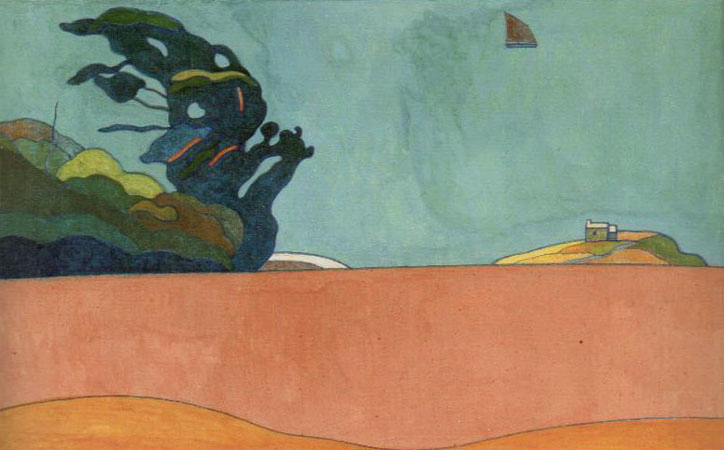
Charles Filiger's "Paysage du Pouldu" (1892)

Charles Filiger (28 November 1863, Thann – 11 January 1928, Brest) was a French Symbolist painter. He was one of the artists who associated with Gauguin at Pont-Aven in Brittany.

== Biography ==
The son of a wallpaper manufacturer in Mulhouse, Filiger first studied decorative arts before specializing in painting at the Académie Colarossi in Paris. He exhibited at the Salon des Indépendants in 1889 and 1890. He arrived in Pont-Aven in 1888 and went on to Le Pouldu staying at the Buvette de la Plage where Gauguin was also a guest. Other artists who joined the colony in the late 1880s and early 1890s included Paul Sérusier, Charles Laval, Meijer de Haan, Armand Séguin, Henry Moret and Émile Jourdan. From 1890, he received a monthly payment of 100 francs from the artists' patron Count Antoine de La Rochefoucauld who was thus able to select Filiger's best works for himself while the remainder were exhibited at Le Barc de Boutteville, Le Salon de la Rose + Croix and other Paris galleries.

After Gauguin's departure in 1895, the other artists soon dispersed. Filiger made frequent moves in the area. After La Rochefoucauld terminated his monthly allowance, he lived in poverty in Kersulé, a hamlet near le Pouldu. He became an alcoholic and drugged himself on ether. After a period in hospital in 1905, he spent four years in a little inn in Gouarec. Breaking his ties with friends and family, from 1911 he lived in Arzano. In 1914, his sister paid for his board at a hotel in Tregunc. When the owners moved to Plougastel the following year, he moved with them for the remainder of his life. He died an alcoholic in January 1928 after being hospitalized in Brest.

== Art ==
André Breton who bought several of Filiger's works considered him to be a surrealist, not strictly within the Pont-Aven school. Nor did Émile Bernard see him as a disciple of Gauguin, characterizing him as a mixture of Byzantine and Breton popular art forms. In Pont-Aven he remained a mystic and a recluse. The area provided fertile ground for his mystical imagery. Indeed, his geometric approach and expressionless faces in subjects such as Virgin and Child (1892) show his interest in early Italian painting and the Italian tradition. His landscapes, for example Breton Shore, reflect Gauguin's abstract quality and simplification. Jan Verkade, who met him in Le Pouldu commented: "He produced very little but I have seen some very beautiful gouaches of his; they are mainly religious paintings, reminiscent of Byzantine and primitive Italian works, but quite personal and quite modern."

== Selected works ==
- Plage au Pouldu (c. 1890), private collection
- Tête d'homme au béret bleu (1892), Musée de Pont-Aven
- Le génie à la guirlande (1892), Musée des Beaux-Arts de Quimper
- Paysage du Pouldu (c. 1892), Musée des Beaux-Arts de Quimper
- Christ au jeune Breton (1895), private collection
- La chapelle au Christ couronné d'épines (c. 1903-1905), Musée du Louvre
- Sainte Pleureuse et ange musicien (recto-verso) (1890 and 1892), Musée d'art contemporain, Strasbourg.

== Gallery ==
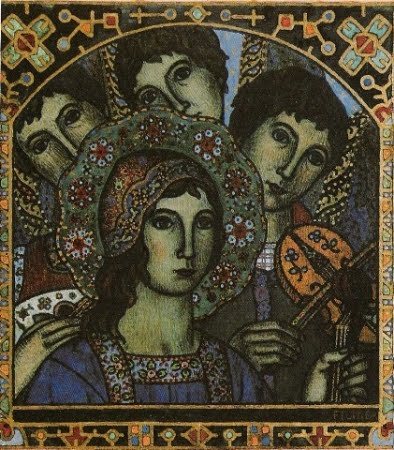

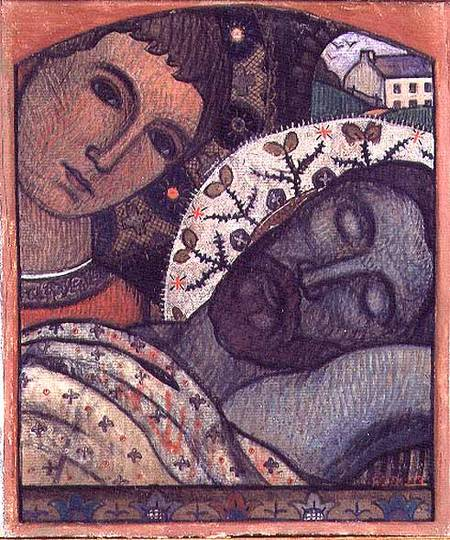

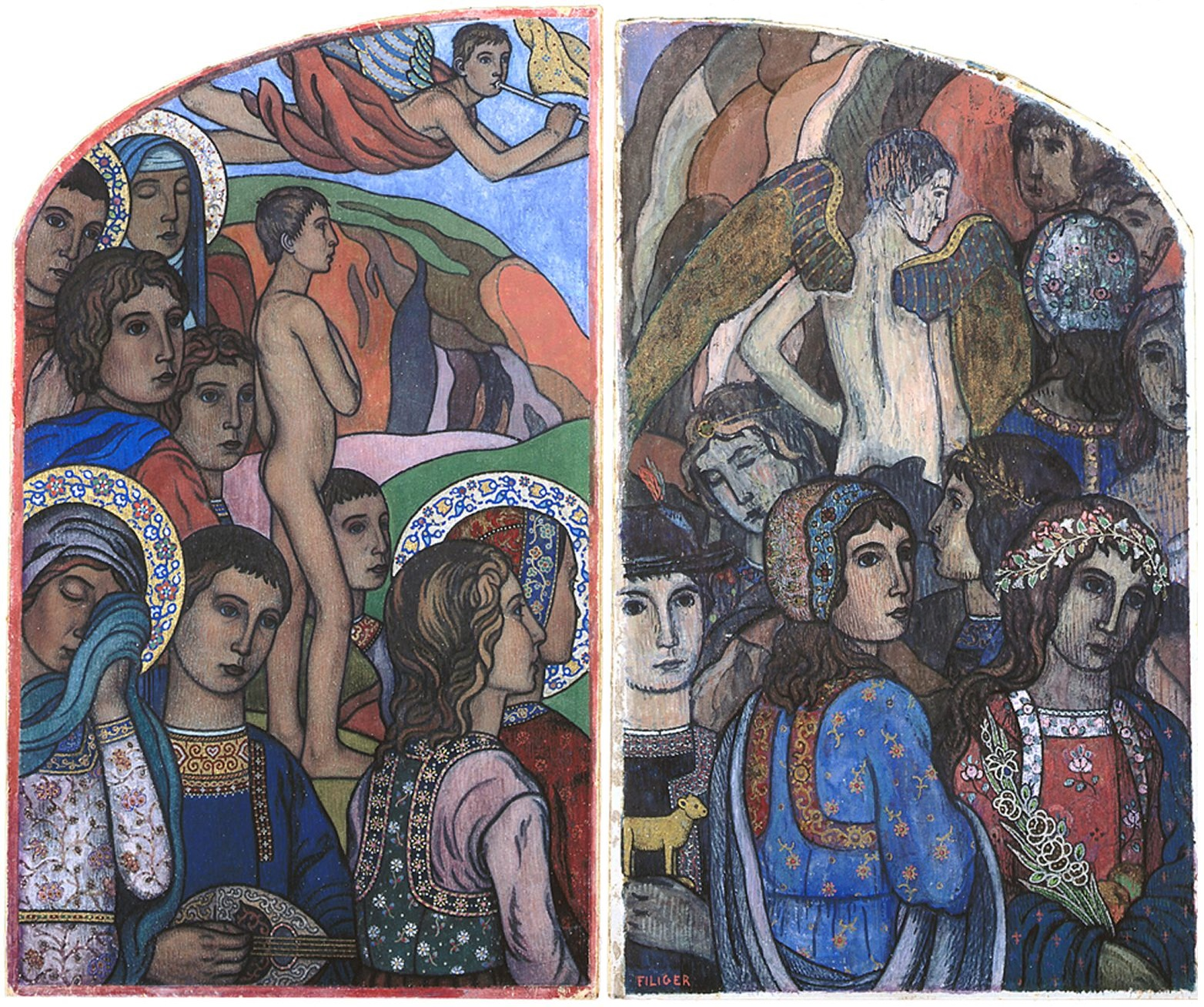

== Bibliography ==
- Coll, Charles Filiger ( 1863-1928) Petite Encyclopédie des Peintres de Bretagne. éd. Le Télégramme, 2001. Photos: Luc Robin. 32. p. ISBN 978-2-914552-06-6
- Antoine de La Rochefoucauld, article in Le Cœur, 1893.
- Félix Fénéon, article in La Vogue, September 1899.
- G. A. Aurier, in Mercure de France, April 1891. Article on Filiger's works at the Salon des Indépendants, 1890.
