= Victor Demanet =

Belgian sculptor

- Born: 3 February 1895; Givet, France
- Died: 7 February 1964 (aged 69); Ixelles, Belgium
- Occupation: Sculptor

Victor Demanet (3 February 1895 – 7 February 1964) was a Belgian sculptor. His work was part of the art competitions at the 1924 Summer Olympics, the 1932 Summer Olympics, and the 1936 Summer Olympics.

== Gallery ==
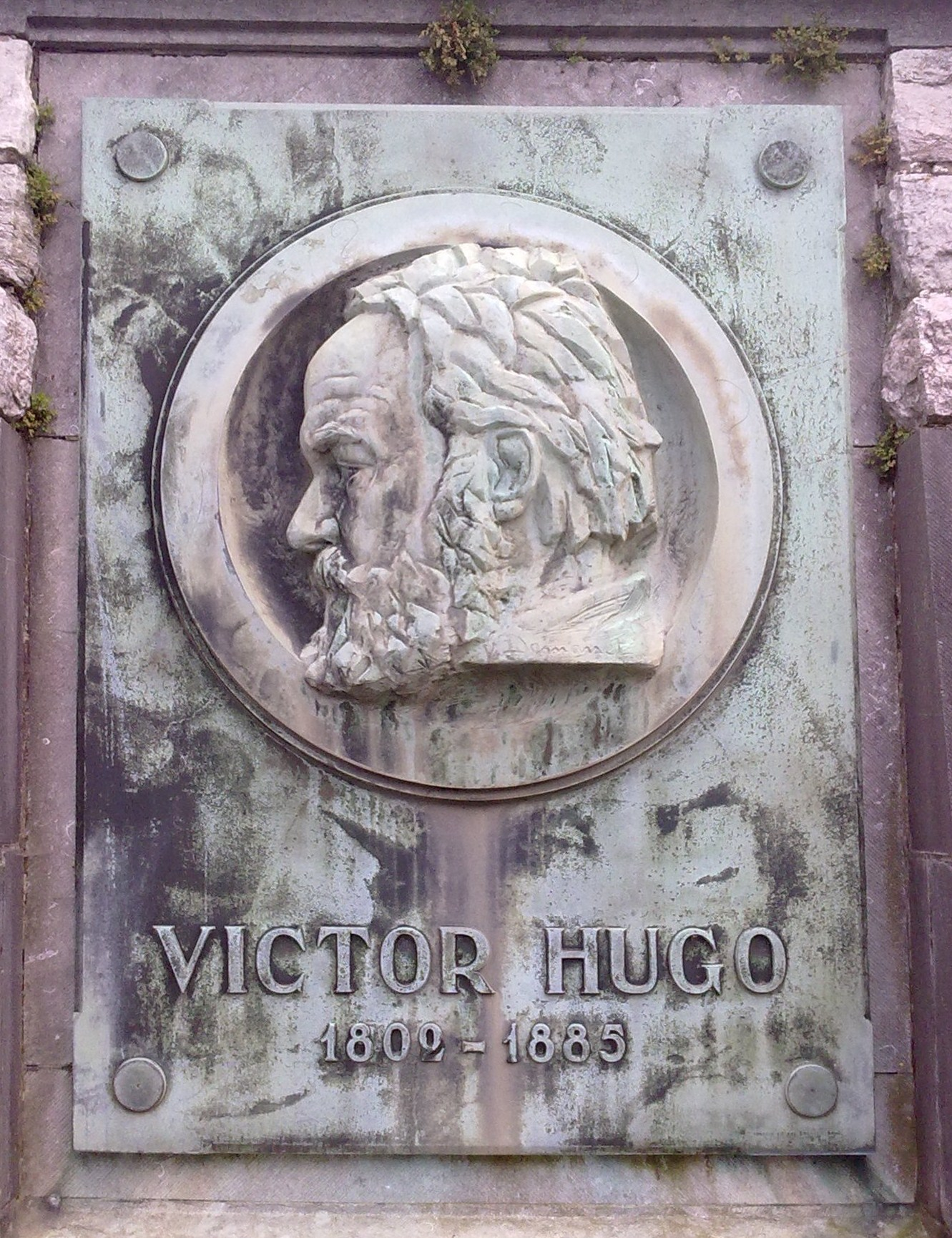
Portrait of Victor Hugo, Monument in Waterloo, Belgium.

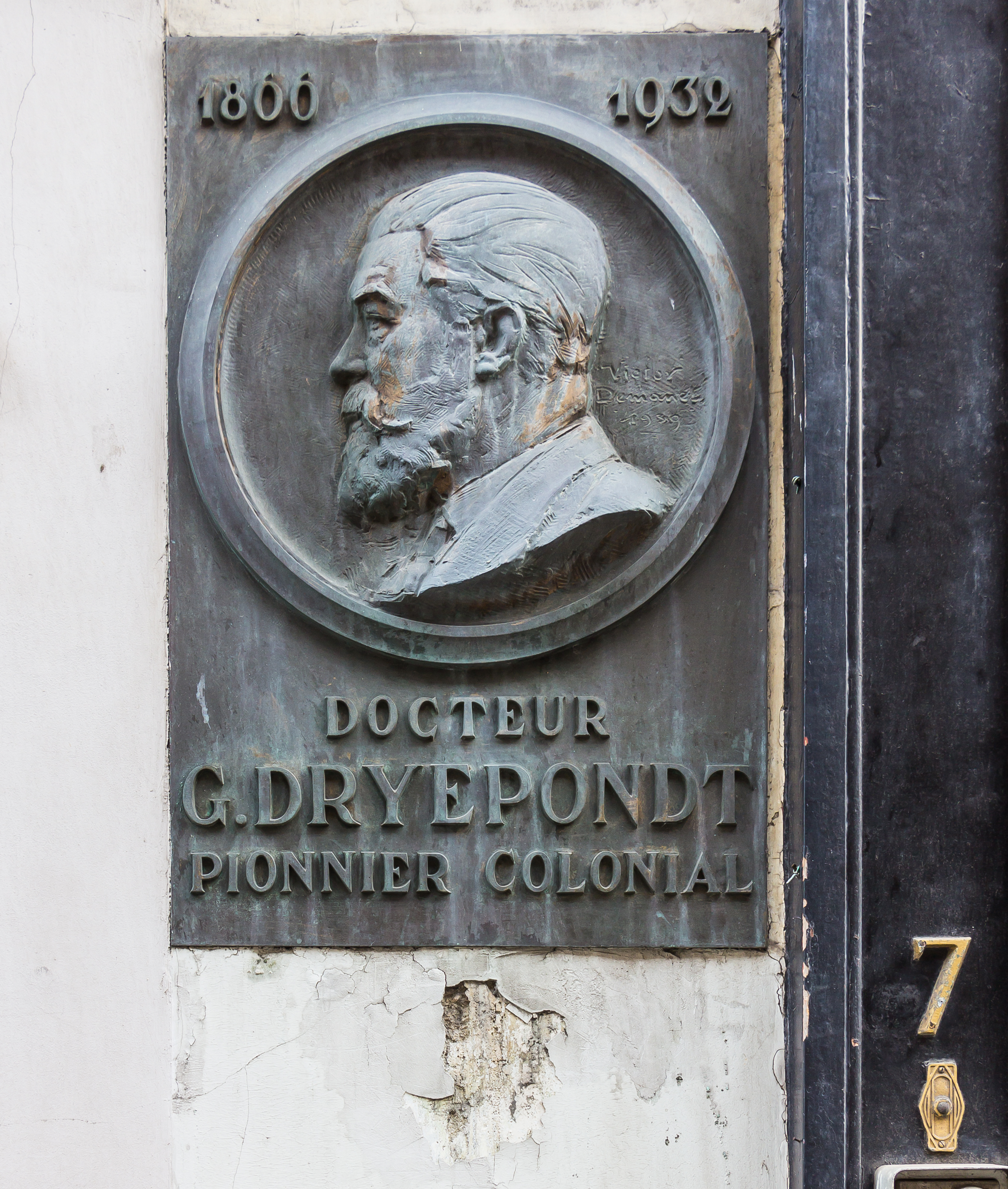
Relief Docteur G. Dreypondt, Wollestraat 7, Brugge
