= Georges Rasetti (painter, born 1851) =

French painter (1851–1938)

Georges Joseph Rasetti
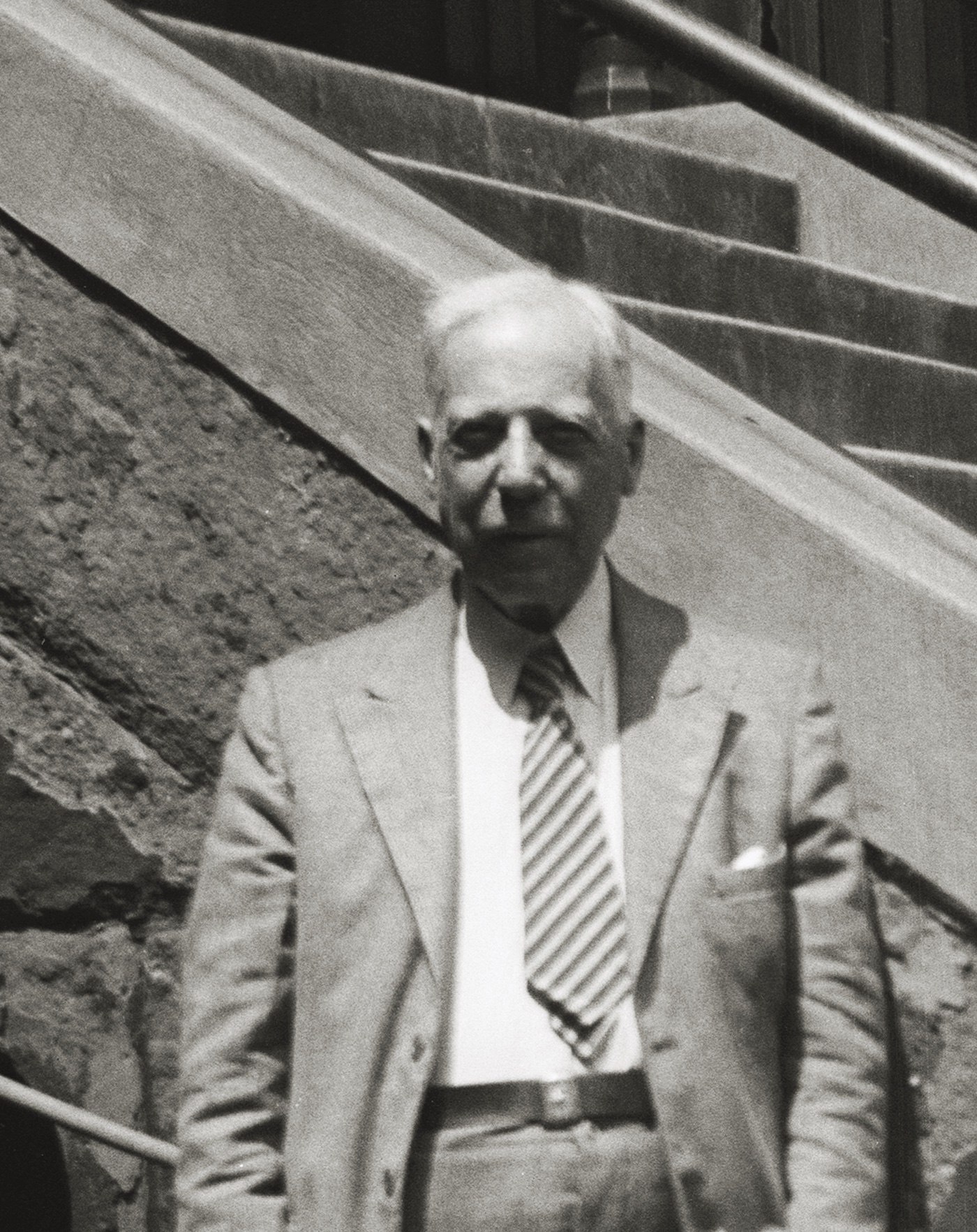
- Born: 15 January 1851; Paris, France
- Died: 22 July 1938 (aged 87); Paris, France
- Occupations: Painter, ceramicist
- Spouse: Céline Alexandrone Constance Chaudet
- Children: Georges Estrel Rasetti; Alice Eléonore Anne Rasetti
- Parents: Victor Auguste Rasetti (father); Eléonore Delaville (mother)

Georges Rasetti (15 January 1851 – 22 July 1938) was a French Post-Impressionist, Nabis inspired and Modernist painter and ceramicist who was born in Paris, France. Rasetti began by being a painter of genre and landscapes. In 1886, he married Céline Chaudet, sister of Georges Chaudet, painter, photographer and art dealer for Paul Gauguin. His son, Georges Estrel Rasetti, was also a painter and sculptor.

Rasetti produced ceramics in his workshop in Colombes, France. He practiced painting during his frequent stays in Brittany, France. His favorite subjects included historical figures, genre scenes, landscapes, seascapes and still-life paintings.

== Biography ==
Study under Bonnat at École des Beaux Artes

Rasetti was a student of the French painter and educator Léon Bonnat. Bonnat was a French painter, Grand Officer of the Legion of Honour and professor at the École des Beaux Arts. In addition, Rasetti was also a student of artist Florent Willems.

The École des Beaux Arts is one of a number of influential art schools in France. It is the cradle of Beaux-Arts style in architecture and city planning that thrived in France and the United States during the end of the nineteenth century and the first quarter of the twentieth century. The school has a history spanning more than 350 years, training many of the great artists in Europe.

Exhibitions at Salon des Artistes Indépendants

Rasetti was a member of the Salon des Artistes Indépendants (Society of Independent Artists) in Paris. The Salon des Artistes Indépendants began with the organization of massive exhibitions in Paris, choosing the slogan "sans jury ni récompense" ("without jury nor reward"). The Salon des Indépendants arose through the need by artists to present their works to the general public independently, rather than through the official selective method of the "Salon" (created by Louis XIV).

Rasetti exhibited at the Salon many times. In 1877, Rasetti exhibited a large canvas entitled David continued by Séméï at the Paris Salon. In 1878, he presented a painting titled La Fagotière de Samois. In 1879, he presented a painting titled Le Chapelet, winning a mention. In 1880 and 1881, Rasetti presented portraits at the Paris Salon; at the same time, he began to produce etchings, including one published in L'Union littéraire des poètes et des prosateurs.

Friendship with Paul Gauguin and Work with Les Nabis

In the fall of 1888, Rasetti met Paul Gauguin, which helped him to break with realism and meet the future Les Nabis. Gauguin was a French Post-Impressionist artist. Unappreciated until after his death, Gauguin is now recognized for his experimental use of color and Synthetist style that were distinct from Impressionism. Rasetti's brother in law, Georges Alfred Chaudet, was a painter, photographer and art dealer for Paul Gauguin until Chaudet's death.

Les Nabis were a group of young French artists active in Paris from 1888 until 1900, who played a large part in the transition from impressionism and academic art to abstract art, symbolism and the other early movements of modernism. The members included Pierre Bonnard, Maurice Denis, Paul Ranson, Édouard Vuillard, Ker-Xavier Roussel, Félix Vallotton, Paul Sérusier and Auguste Cazalis. Rasetti introduced Les Nabis to the techniques of ceramics in his Bois-Colombes workshop. Bois-Colombes is a commune in the northwestern suburbs of Paris, France. It is located 9 km (5.6 mi) from the center of Paris.

Participation in the Artists School of Pont-Avon

Rasetti was a member of the School of Pont-Avon. He was a ceramicist at the Pont-Avon school. The Pont-Aven School encompasses works of art influenced by the Breton town of Pont-Aven and its surroundings. Originally, the term applied to works created in the artists' colony at Pont-Aven, which started to emerge in the 1850s and lasted until the beginning of the 20th century. Many of the artists were inspired by the works of Paul Gauguin, who spent extended periods in the area in the late 1880s and early 1890s. Their work is frequently characterized by the bold use of pure color and their Symbolist choice of subject matter. Rasetti was very close with Pont-Aven painters Armand Seguin and Paul Sérusier.

Rasetti's painting Élégantes au jardin public (1890-1892, unsigned oil on canvas, 38 x 55 cm) is representative of the Pont-Aven influence. With this work, Rasetti offers a reinterpretation of a famous painting by Paul Gauguin, Jardin public à Arles, from December 1888.

Brittany and Huelgoat in 1891

During the summer of 1891, Rasetti and his wife Céline Chaudet went to Brittany, a region in northwestern France. There, he spent time with his friends, artist Paul Sérusier, a French painter who was a pioneer of abstract art and an inspiration for the avant-garde Nabis movement, Synthetism and Cloisonnism; artist Jan Verkade, a Dutch Post-Impressionist and Christian Symbolist painter; and artist Mogens Ballin, a Danish artist and silversmith. Rasetti introduced them to painting on ceramics.

At a celebration for Gauguin in March 1891, Mogens Ballin met the Dutch painter Jan Verkade, who had a marked influence on the development of his career. After this celebration, Gauguin departed for Tahiti. Ballin and Verkade went to Brittany together, staying at the Pension Gloanec, an inn in Pont-Aven, Brittany, France. Pension Gloanec was a base for artists of the Pont-Aven School in the last half of the 19th century. It was known for economical but excellent quality food, where the diners served themselves from shared dishes set out on a long table in the dining room. Pension Gloanec's most famous resident was Paul Gauguin, who stayed several times between 1886 and 1894. Today the building houses a bookstore, gallery and exhibition space. Later in 1891, Ballin and Verkade joined Sérusier and Rasetti in Huelgoat, a commune in the Finistère department of France.

Son Georges Estrel Rasetti's Exhibit at the 1924 and 1928 Olympics

Rasetti's son, Georges Estrel Rasetti, participated in the painting event in the art competition at the 1928 Summer Olympics. Georges Estrel Rasetti's work, titled Cross-Country, was an 80 cm tall oil-on-canvas painting featuring football players. In addition, Georges Estrel Rasetti also participated in the painting event in the art competition at the 1924 Summer Olympics in Paris, France.

== Paintings and artwork ==
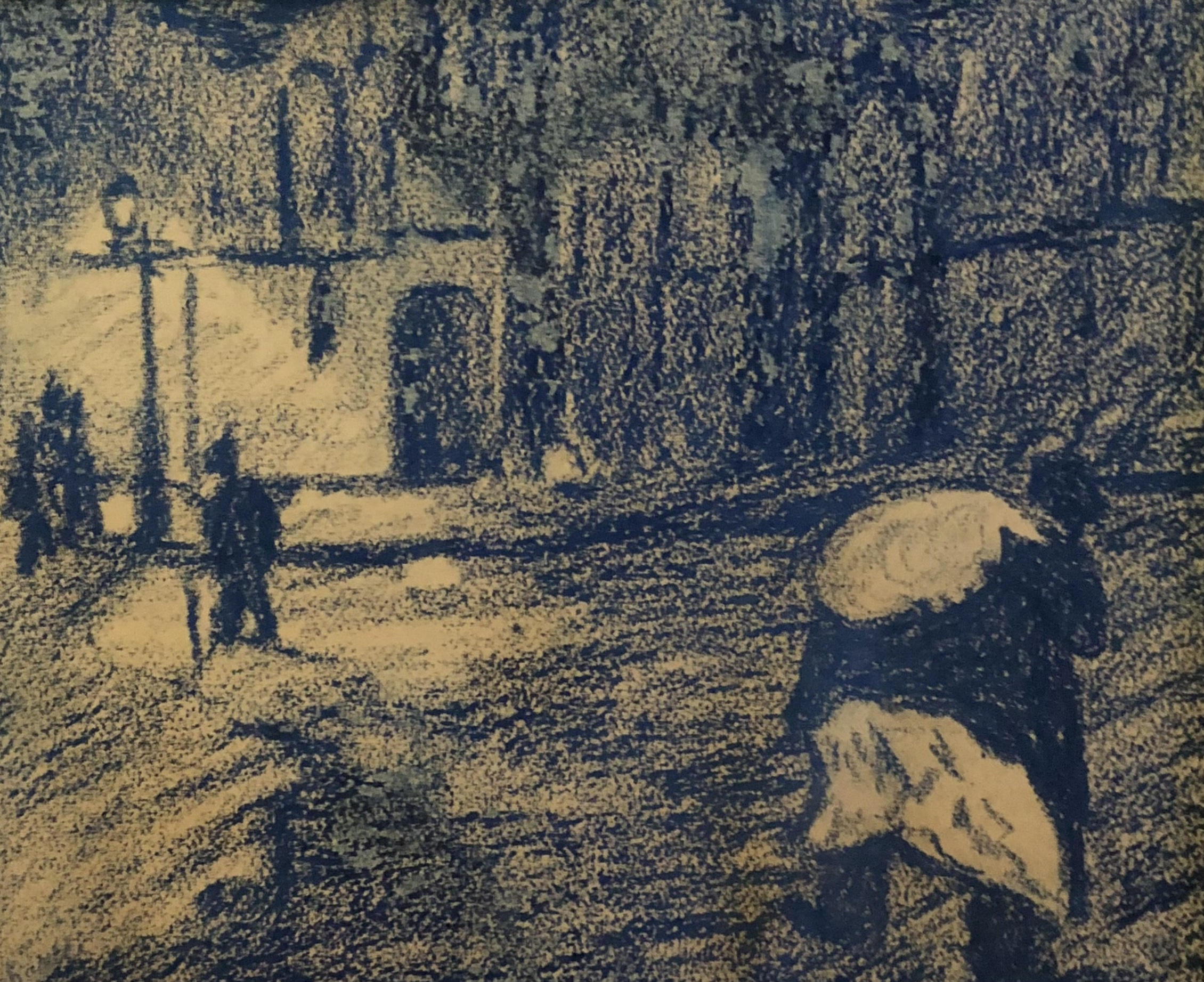
Une Rue de Nuit, Paris (A Street at Night, Paris). Circa early 1900s.

Georges Rasetti's work has been offered at auction multiple times, with realized prices ranging from US$1,841 to US$22,354 depending on the size and medium of the work. Since 2007, the record price for Rasetti at auction is US$22,354 for Le Chemin, sold at Boisgirard-Antonini in Paris, France, in 2019.

== Personal life ==
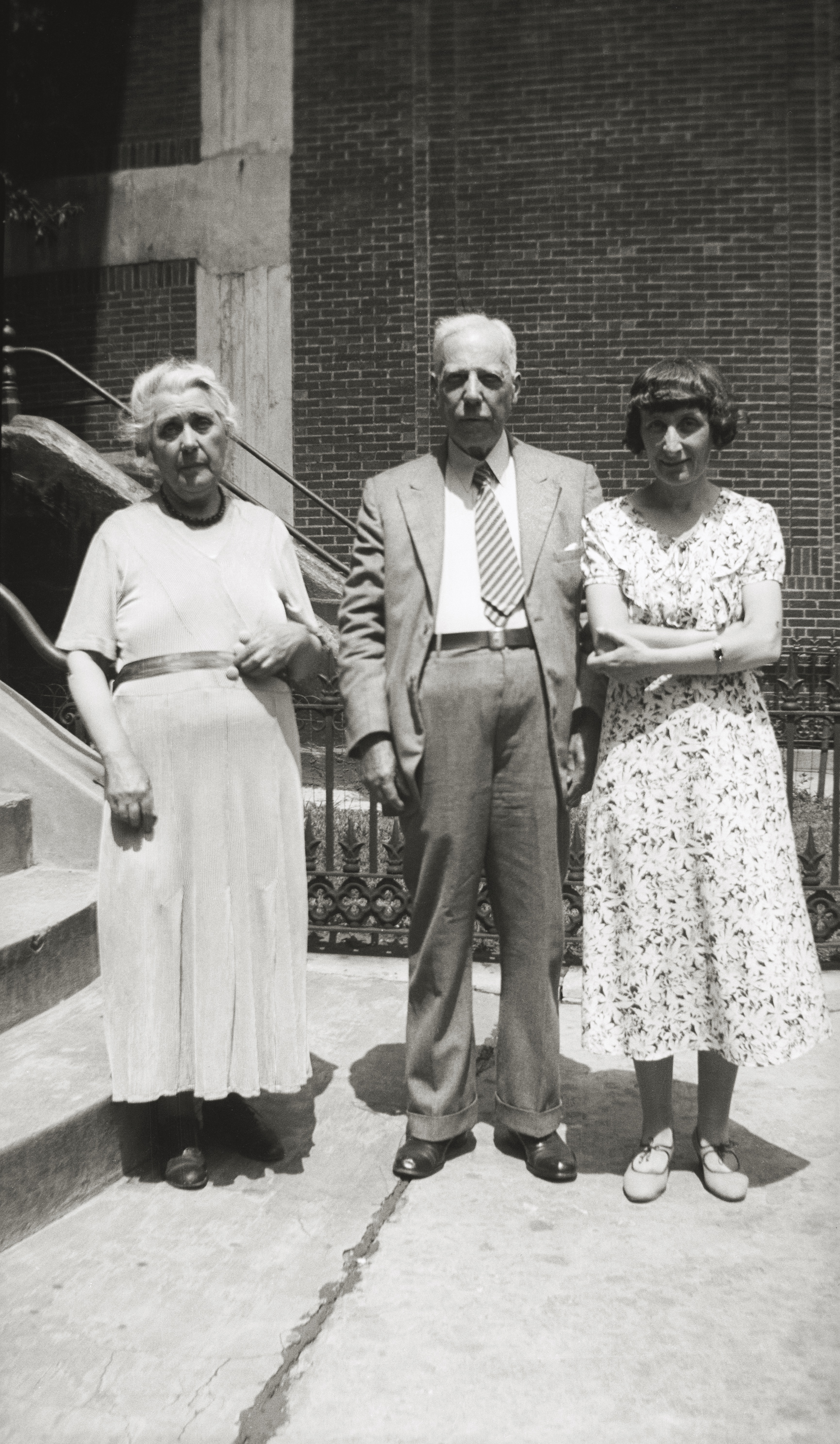
Pictured left to right: Celine Alexandrone Constance Chaudet (wife of Georges Joseph Rasetti), painter and ceramicist Georges Joseph Rasetti, and Alice Eléonore Anne Rasetti (daughter of Georges Joseph Rasetti).

Georges Joseph Rasetti was born in Paris, France, on 15 January 1851. He was the son of the ornamental sculptor Victor Auguste Rasetti (1824–1898) who owned a workshop at 18 rue Pierre-Charron in Paris, France.

In 1886, Rasetti married Céline Alexandrone Constance Chaudet (1863–1941), sister of Georges Alfred Chaudet.

Georges Chaudet was a painter, photographer and art dealer for Paul Gauguin. George Chaudet died in 1899. Georges Chaudet was a member of the Société des Artistes Français, with whom he exhibited. Georges Chaudet met Gauguin in the Breton village of Douarnenez, in Brittany, France, and became Gauguin's friend and art dealer until Chaudet's death. In 1891, Chaudet participated in a group exhibition in Pont-Aven together with Gustav Loiseau and Armand Séguin. The refined colors and hieratic style of his landscapes and still life paintings betray the influence of both Gauguin and Cézanne.

Rasetti's son with Céline Chaudet was named Georges Estrel Rasetti. Georges Estrel Rasetti, who sometimes signed his paintings as Estrel, was also a painter and sculptor. Georges Estrel Rasetti exhibited in the painting competition at the 1928 Summer Olympics in Amsterdam, the Netherlands. His painting was an oil on canvas painting called Cross-country that was 80x117 cm. In addition, Georges Estrel Rasetti also participated in the painting event in the art competition at the 1924 Summer Olympics in Paris, France.

Rasetti's daughter, Alice Eléonore Anne Rasetti (1894–1944), was an artist in her own right, making hundreds of French character stockinette dolls over the course of her lifetime. For example, Cloth Man from Brittany, France and Normandy French Character Dolls.
