= Rasetti =

Rasetti is a surname. Notable people with the surname include:

- Georges Rasetti (painter, born 1851) (1851–1938), French painter, father of Estrel
- Georges Estrel Rasetti (1889–1957), French painter
