= Pension Gloanec =

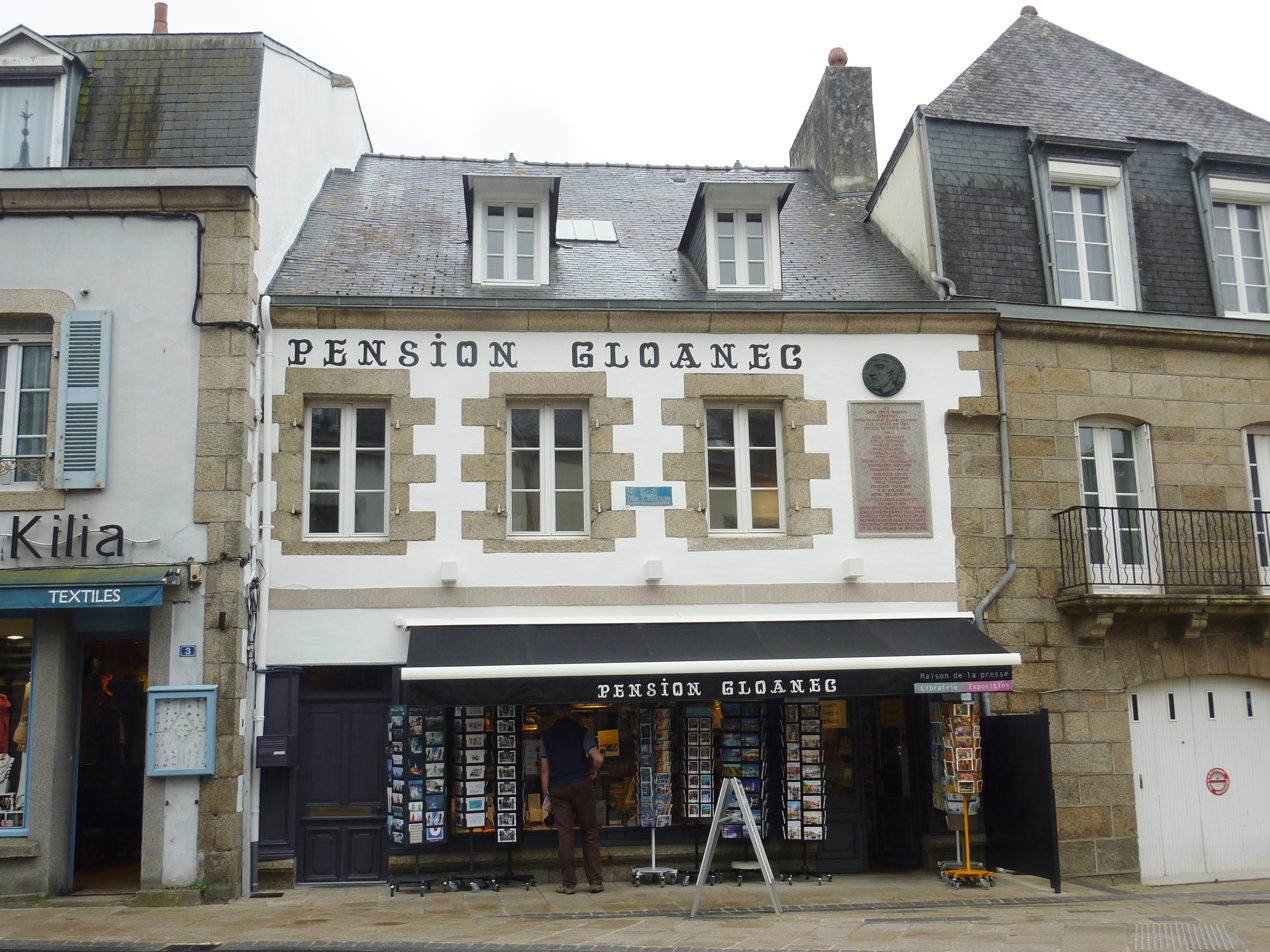
- Pension Gloanec in May 2016

- Location within France

General information
- Type: Pension, art gallery
- Coordinates: 47.855194°N 3.747833°W

Technical details
- Floor count: 2

Design and construction
- Known for: Pont-Aven School

Website
- www.pensiongloanec.com

The Pension Gloanec was a pension in Pont-Aven, Brittany, France, that was a base for artists of the Pont-Aven School in the last half of the 19th century. It was known for economical but excellent quality food, where the diners served themselves from shared dishes set out on a long table in the dining room. There were few rooms, so most of the artists boarded elsewhere in the town. Its most famous resident was Paul Gauguin who stayed several times between 1886 and 1894. Today the building houses a bookstore, gallery and exhibition space.

== Artists discover the village ==
Pont-Aven was "discovered" in 1864 by the American painter Henry Bacon (1839–1912). Two American art students, Earl Shinn (1838–1886) and Howard Roberts (1843–1900), arrived in Paris in the spring on 1866 and applied for admission to the École des Beaux-Arts. Their teacher in Philadelphia, Robert Wylie (1839–1877), had encouraged them to visit Pont-Aven in the summer. Word spread, and about twelve American and English artists spent the summer of 1866 in the village. The villager were friendly to the artists, found them studio space in the run-down Château de Lezaven, and were glad to pose for them.

The painters appreciated the beauty of the surrounding landscape and the low living costs. They would use barns or sheds as studios. A growing number of foreign artists returned year after year, and some settled more or less permanently. French artists began to visit the village in the mid- to late 1870s. The village became fashionable with members of the Salon in Paris. The artists stayed at the Hôtel des Voyageurs or the Pension Gloanec, or else found lodgings in the villagers' houses.

== Proprietors ==
The Pension Gloanec was opened in 1860 by Marie-Jeanne Gloanec (1839–1915) and Joseph Gloanec (1829–1906). Marie-Jeanne Morvant, later known as "La Mère Gloanec", was born on 8 February 1839 in Pont-Aven, daughter of a tailor and a chambermaid. Some time later her father opened a small inn, where Marie-Jeanne learned the trade. Her future husband was born on 10 March 1829 in Pont-Scorff.

Both Joseph and Marie-Jeanne Gloanec were almost illiterate. Joseph Gloanec worked as a sawyer and mill repairer before they opened the inn. Arthur Hoeber (1854–1915) described him as a "prince of scoundrels and incomparable idlers, with a halo of vague and misty tales of his early life as a smuggler and wrecker on the wild coast nearby, never quite authenticated, but giving him much distinction and interest." Birge Harrison (1854–1929) described Marie Jeanne Gloanec as a "dear, wizened, motherly woman. She was an excellent cook, and took great pleasure in the company of her artists.

== Inn ==
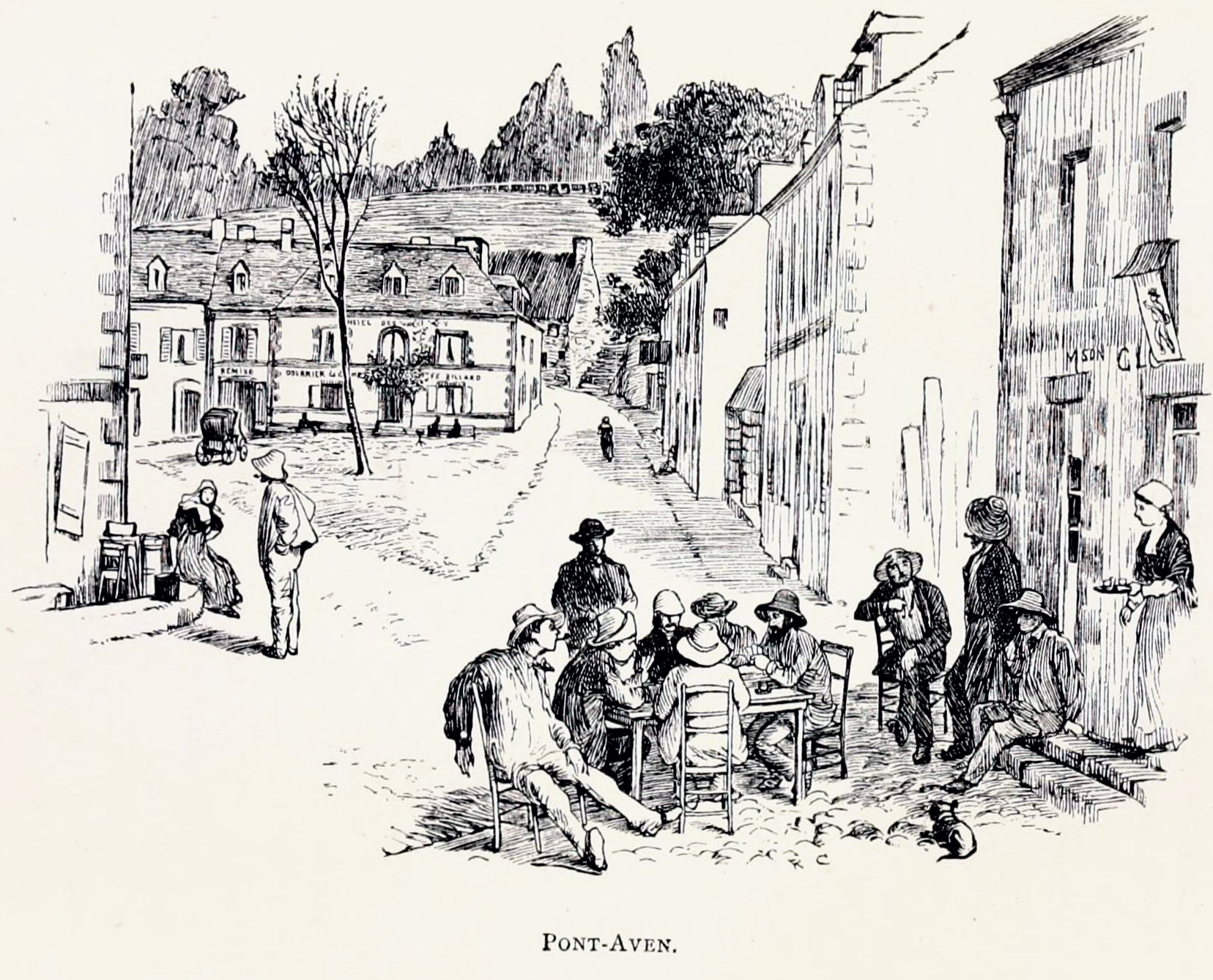
Artists outside the pension (1880). Hôtel de Voyageurs in background.

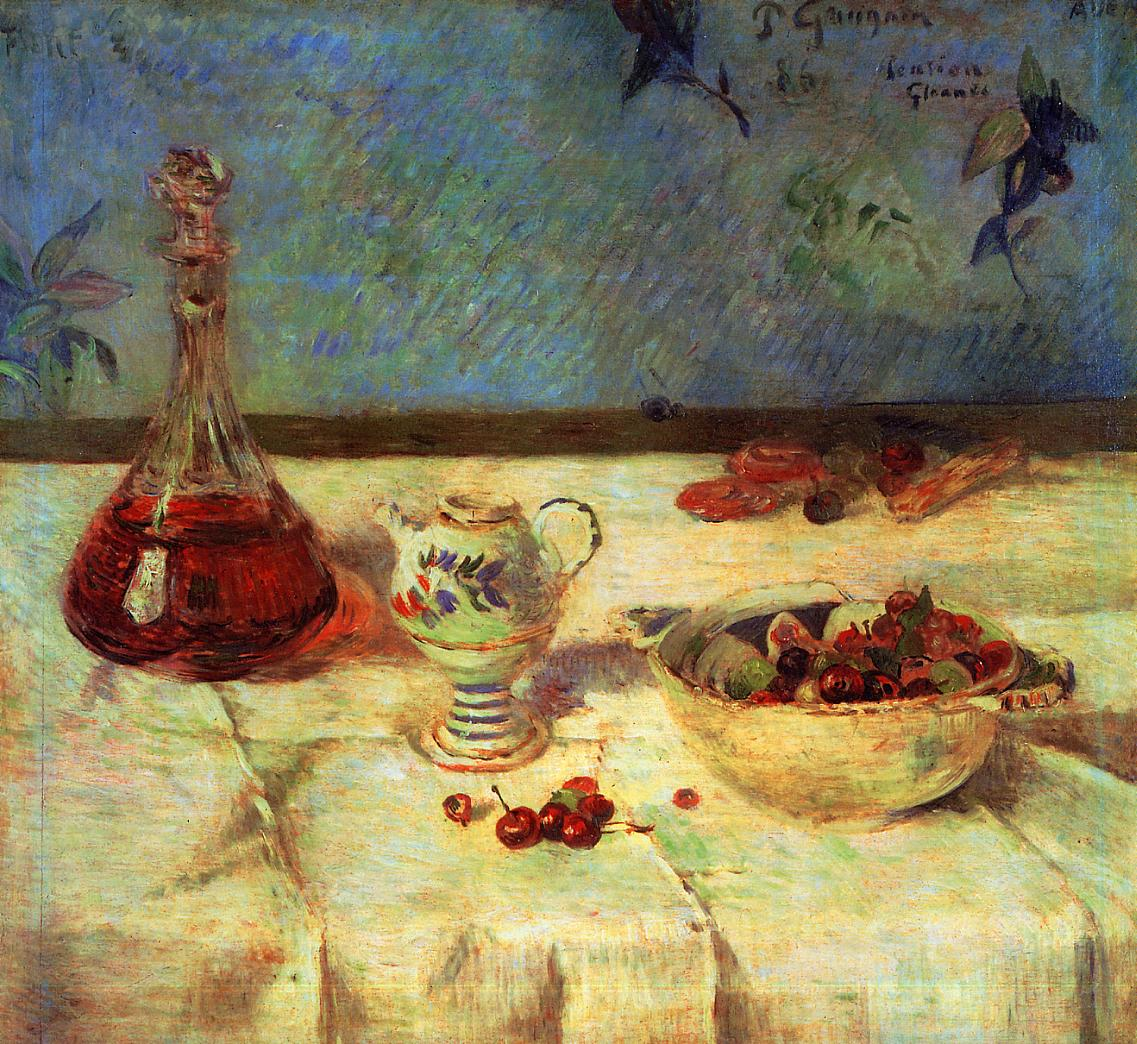
Gauguin 1886 La Nappe blanche

The Pension Gloanec was at the entrance to the Pont-Aven village square. There were few rooms for rent, and most of the artists lived elsewhere in the town and only ate at the pension. The auberge had only two rooms on the ground floor. At the front the kitchen-living room was entered from the square, and had a large fireplace. Corwin Knapp Linson (1864–1959) said the kitchen had two great Breton beds on either side of the fireside in which the mistress and her maids slept. He wrote that the "time honoured fireplace was framed in a blazonment of brass and copper utensils which blinked, flashed, glowed according to ever changing humour of light."

Behind the kitchen was the dining room, where food was served "to fatten you on the spot". The dining room was lined with beams and floorboards, drawings and studies. The work of the regular guests covered the walls of the kitchen and dining room, depicting the local men and women who posed for the artists. The patronnes would often extend credit to the artists, or accept paintings as payment, and the artists were proud to have their work accepted and displayed. In this way, the Gloanecs acquired a major collection.

The painter Édouard Girardet (1819–1880) described the pension in 1876, when Aloysius O'Kelly (1853–1936) was staying there, as the rowdiest of the inns compared to the Hôtel des Voyageurs, favored by the Americans and the Hôtel du Lion d'Or, favored by the French. Thomas Hovenden stayed in the pension at that time, as did the American brothers Alexander and Birge Harrison.

Henry Blackburn's Breton Folk: An Artistic Tour of Brittany (1880) described the pension as a quaint little auberge down by the bridge. The signboard was painted by one of the inmates (Note: The signboard was painted by Herman van den Anker and Fernand Quignon.), and the panels of the rooms were also decorated with works of art. It was the true Bohemian home in the town where lodgings and two good meals per day with cider could be had for sixty francs a month. In the evening and in the morning, casually-dressed artists could be seen sitting around a table in the road, some of them with worldwide reputations.

Birge Harrison wrote in 1888 that the delicious food of the dear old Marie-Jeanne was known by all the artists. Three busy waitresses served the tables with steaming dishes among the hubbub and gaiety, and from time to time Marie-Jeanne appeared at the door to join the cheerful atmosphere. Mortimer Menpes (1855–1938) stayed at the Pension Gloanec with his wife and daughter Dorothy. Dorothy described the dining room "where rough men sat on either side of a long table, serving themselves out of a common dish, and dipping great slices of bread into their plates." Dorothy's mother categorized the painters as "Stripists, Dottists and Spottists, a sect of the Dottists, whose differentiation was too subtle to be understood. Several other artists stayed at the pension, including Émile Bernard and Arthur Wesley Dow.

== Gauguin ==
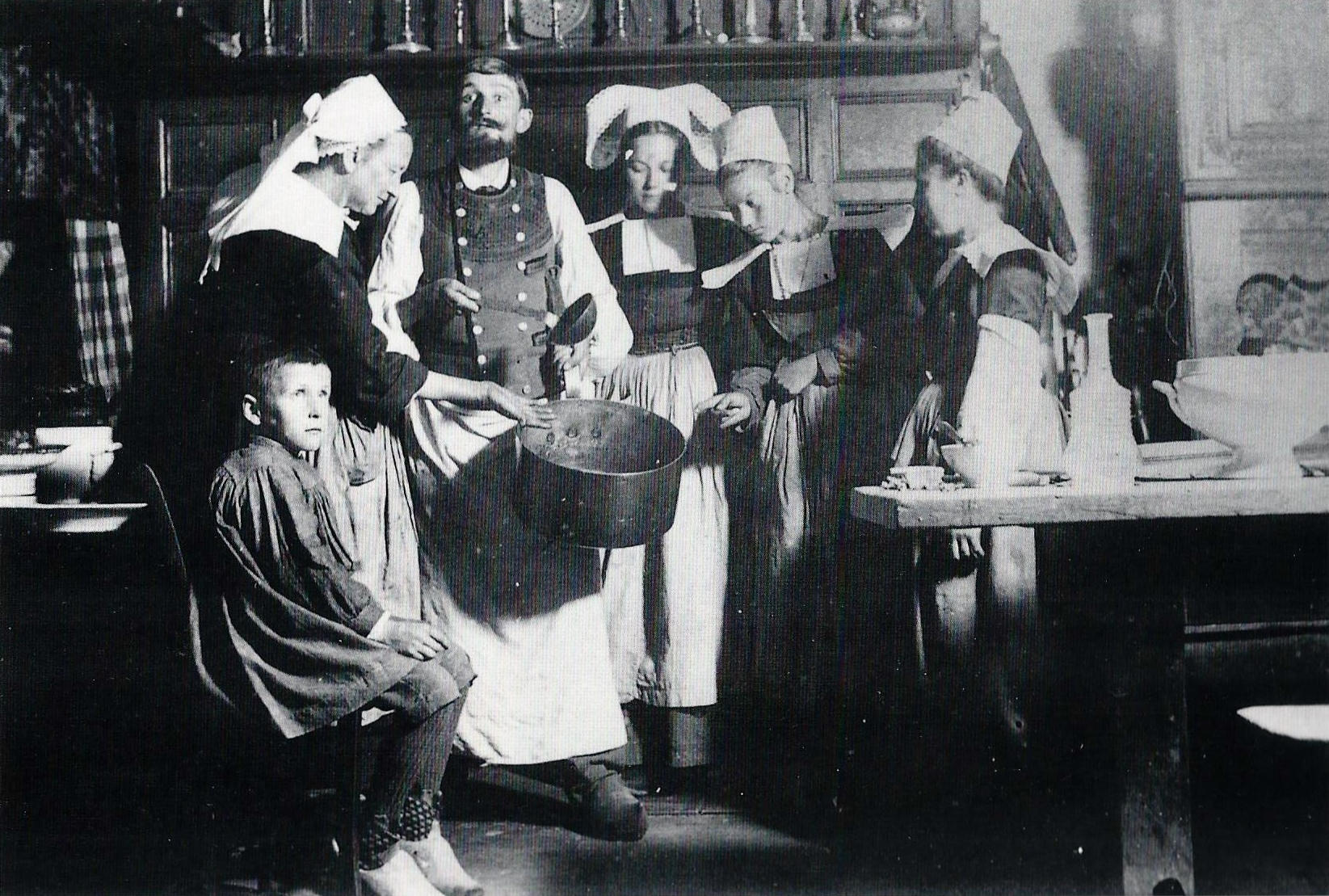
Kitchen of the pension in 1892(?) (Note: Gauguin was in Tahiti from 1891 to 1893, so the photograph must be earlier or later than 1892.). Paul Gauguin in center

Paul Gauguin first stayed at the Pension Gloanec in June 1886, and found that the guests were almost all foreigners. Gauguin's studio in the Pension Gloanec in 1888 was decorated by prints by Utamaro. In early October 1888 Paul Sérusier was staying at the Pension Gloanec, where he submitted a canvas to Gauguin for criticism. The next morning Gauguin took him to the Bois d'Amour on the edge of Pont-Aven and gave him a lesson in colour. That morning Sérusier painted The Talisman (1888), which he described to his friends when he returned to Paris as being based on "the concept, still unknown to us of the painting as a flat surface covered in colours assembled in a certain order."

Gauguin left Pont-Aven in 1889 to escape from the many painters living there. Marie Jeanne Gloanec, "la mère des peintres", earned enough from her painters to build a larger hotel in the town square. In 1892 the establishment was transferred to the Hotel Gloanec on the town square, later renamed the Hotel Le Glouannec.

The writer Alfred Jarry (1873–1907) visited Pont-Aven in June 1894 and booked into the Pension Gloanec, where he found Gauguin laid up with a broken leg caused by a fall during a fight with some fishermen in Concarneau. Gauguin spent his enforced stay in the inn making woodcuts from the subjects of his Tahitian paintings. Jarry wrote poems about three of Gauguin's Tahitian paintings in the Pension Gloanec Livre d'or, which had been started on 23 June 1894 by Gauguin, Eric Forbes-Robertson (1865–1935) and Roderic O'Conor (1860–1940). Jarry dated his poems 1 July 1894 and dedicated them to Gauguin. (Note: The poems that Jarry carefully inscribed in the house book of the Pension Gloanec could have been composed any time between November 1893 and July 1894.) Jarry created the woodcut illustrations for his first book while in Pont-Aven.

== Later history ==
Marie-Jeanne died in 1915. Today the original Pension Gloanec is home to a bookstore that specializes in artistic books, with an area for meetings and exhibitions, and a permanent exhibition work by Henri Rivière and Breton prints. The Hotel Gloanec is now Les Ajoncs d'Or.

== Sources ==
- Blackburn, Henry (1881), Breton folk : an artistic tour in Brittany, illustrated by Randolph Caldecott, Boston: Osgood
- Boucheix, Bernard (15 December 2017), LA MERE GLOANEC: Bretagne 1830 - 1915, EDITIONS CREER, ISBN 978-2-84819-653-4
- Davies, Gwendolyn (13 August 2015), Fiction Treasures by Maritime Writers: Best-selling novelists of Canadas Maritime provinces 1860-1950, Formac Publishing Company Limited, ISBN 978-1-4595-0377-9
- Fell, Jill (2005), Alfred Jarry, an Imagination in Revolt, Fairleigh Dickinson Univ Press, ISBN 978-0-8386-4007-4
- Fell, Jill (15 August 2010), Alfred Jarry, Reaktion Books, ISBN 978-1-86189-887-6
- Golding, John (1 January 1994), Visions of the Modern, University of California Press, ISBN 978-0-520-08792-7
- Ives, Colta Feller (1974), The Great Wave: the Influence of Japanese Woodcuts on French Prints, Metropolitan Museum of Art, ISBN 978-0-87099-228-5
- "La Escuela de Pont-Aven", Aparences.net (in Spanish)
- La Pension Gloanec (in French), La Pension Gloanec, archived from the original on 2021-01-25
- Lübbren, Nina (2001), Rural Artists' Colonies in Europe, 1870-1910, Manchester University Press, ISBN 978-0-7190-5867-7
- Nicholson, William (12 June 2007), The Trial of True Love, Knopf Doubleday Publishing Group, ISBN 978-0-307-38700-4
- O'Sullivan, Niamh (2010), Aloysius O'Kelly: Art, Nation, Empire, Field Day Publications, ISBN 978-0-946755-42-4
- Paul, Charles-Guy Le; Paul, Judy Le (1987), Gauguin and the Impressionists at Pont-Aven, Abbeville Press, ISBN 978-0-89659-773-0
- Roger Le Brun (13 November 2009), La Pension et l’Hôtel Gloanec à Pont-Aven (in French)
