= Chaudet =

Chaudet is a surname. Notable people with the surname include:

- Antoine-Denis Chaudet (1763–1810), French sculptor
- Georges Chaudet (1870–1899), French photographer, painter, and art dealer/agent
- Jeanne-Elisabeth Chaudet (died 1832), French painter
- Louis Chaudet (1884–1965), American film director
- Paul Chaudet (1904–1977), Swiss politician
