= The Talisman (painting) =

1888 painting by Paul Sérusier

- Paysage au Bois d'Amour (French)
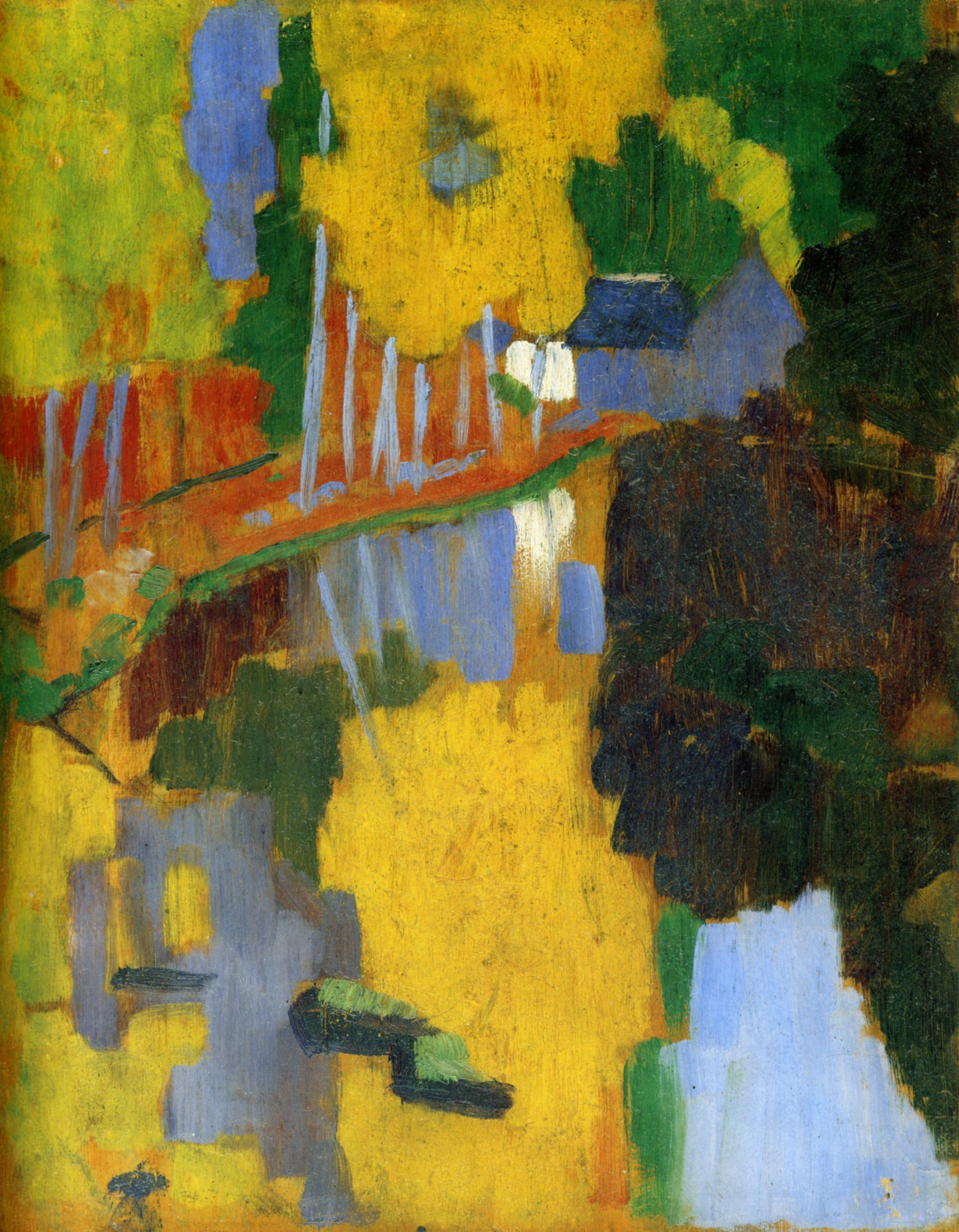
- Artist: Paul Sérusier
- Year: 1888
- Medium: Oil on wood
- Subject: Pont-Aven, Brittany
- Dimensions: 27 cm × 21.5 cm (11 in × 8.5 in)
- Location: Musée d'Orsay; Paris

The Talisman is a painting by French artist Paul Sérusier made in 1888, under the guidance of Paul Gauguin at the artist's colony of Pont-Aven in Brittany. Formally known as The Bois d'Amour at Pont Aven, it was called The Talisman and became the starting point and icon of the group of young painters called The Nabis. It was a landmark in early Post-Impressionism, Synthetism, and Cloisonnism. It is now in the Musée d'Orsay in Paris.

== History ==
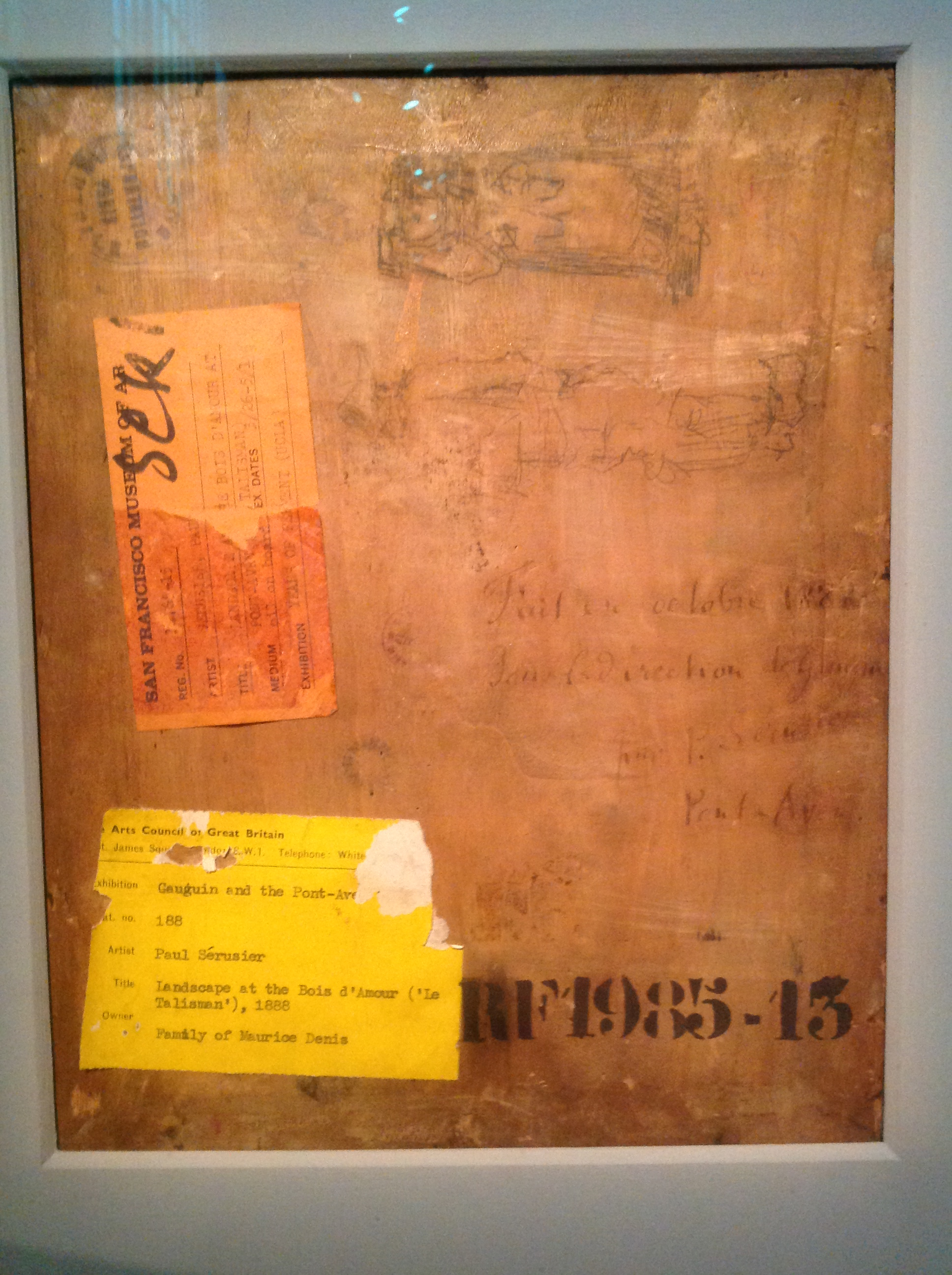
Back of the painting, with inscription by Serusier: "Made in October 1888 under the direction of Gauguin by P. Sérusier at Pont-Aven."

In October 1888 the young painter Paul Sérusier, age twenty-four, traveled to the artist's colony at Pont-Aven in Brittany, with a letter of introduction to Paul Gauguin. Sérusier had completed his studies at the Lycée Fontaine (now the Lycée Condorcet) in Paris, where he had met other aspiring artists, including Pierre Bonnard and Maurice Denis, the future Nabis. Together they had enrolled at a private art school, the Académie Julian. With his letter to Gauguin from Émile Bernard, he intended to make studies of nature in the picturesque countryside around Pont-Aven.

Sérusier later described his experience to Maurice Denis, who recounted it later in his own book. Sérusier and Gauguin had walked to the Bois d'Amour, a particularly picturesque landscape of forest and rocks along the river Aven, not far from the village. There, according to Sérusier's account to Denis, Gauguin told him: "How do you see these trees? They're yellow. So, put some yellow. This shadow, it's rather blue, paint it with pure ultramarine. Those red leaves? Put vermillion." The result was a painting with pure and flat colors, which represented not a representation of the scene, but the visual sensations of the painter.

On the back of the canvas, Sérusier wrote, "Made in October 1888 under the direction of Gauguin by P. Sérusier at Pont-Aven." He brought the painting back to Paris, and showed it to his fellow students at the Academie Julian. Many of them made fun of it, but several, particularly Maurice Denis, Pierre Bonnard, and Paul Ranson, Henri-Gabriel Ibels and Renée Piot, were highly enthusiastic. His friends, the future Nabis, gave the small painting the name The Talisman, and made it the emblem of their new movement. Describing the first presentation of the painting Maurice Denis wrote in 1903, "Thus we were presented, for the first time, in a form that was paradoxal and unforgettable, the fertile concept of a flat surface covered with colors assembled in a certain order.

The Talisman was not in fact a finished work; it was intended a sketch for a future work, but Sérusier decided not to modify it. The painting was placed in the studio of the oldest of the Nabi painters, Paul-Élie Ranson, age twenty-four, at 25, boulevard du Montparnasse, which was humorously called "The Temple" by the Nabis. It was Ranson who gave the painting the name The Talisman, and he hung it on the wall during the weekly semi-serious ceremonies of the group.

Sérusier was active in the Nabis in the beginning, but in about 1895 he began to turn toward the doctrine of esotericism, and the mystical theories of Father Desiderius Lenz. He left Paris in 1895 to settle at Châteauneuf-du-Faou in Brittany. He died in 1927.

The reputation of Sérusier and the Talisman was kept alive by the efforts of Maurice Denis, the chief theorist and historian of the Nabis, He became the guardian of the painting in about 1903, and wrote continually about the importance of the artist and the work. After the death of Denis, the painting became part of the collection of the French government, and eventually of the Musée d'Orsay in Paris.

== Influence ==
The Talisman inspired a series of paintings by the Nabis, following the same principles that Gauguin had expressed to Sérusier. Maurice Denis cited the Talisman in his famous 1914 essay, New Theories of Modern Art and on Sacred Art: "Remember that a painting, before it is a horse in battle, a nude woman or a sort of anecdote, is essentially a flat surface covered with colors assembled in a certain order."

== Bibliography ==
- Le Talisman de Paul Sérusier- Une prophétie de la couleur , L'Objet d'Art Hors-Série (in French)
- Bouillon, Jean-Paul (2006). Maurice Denis - Le spirituel dans l'art (in French). Paris: Gallimard. ISBN 978-2-07-031929-9.
