= Georges Estrel Rasetti =

French painter

Georges Rasetti
- Born: 25 May 1889; Paris, France
- Died: 6 November 1957 (aged 68); Contes, France
- Citizenship: French
- Occupation: Painter
- Parent(s): Father: Georges Joseph Rasetti; Mother: Céline Alexandrone Constance Chaudet

Georges Estrel Rasetti (25 May 1889 to 6 November 1957), was a French painter and sculptor who sometimes signed his paintings as Estrel. He was the son of painter and ceramicist, Georges Joseph Rasetti (1851 to 1938). He was born in Paris, France, and died in Contes, France, which is in the Alpes-Maritimes department of France.

== Biography ==
Georges Estrel Rasetti lived at 6 Rue Choron, in the 9th Arrondissement of Paris, France, a building with multiple apartments where his father Georges Joseph Rasetti and his mother Celine Chaudet also lived. His father Georges Rasetti died on 22 July 1938 and his mother Celine Chaudet died on 5 May 1941

While living in Paris, France, he worked with his father and exhibited at the Salon d’Automne, an annual art show in Paris that started in 1903. Perceived as a reaction against the conservative policies of the official Paris Salon, this massive exhibition almost immediately became the showpiece of developments and innovations in 20th-century painting, drawing, sculpture, engraving, architecture and decorative arts. He also exhibited with Société des Artistes Indépendants., which is an annual independent art exhibition that was aimed at drawing a large audience. It takes place in Paris and was established in 1884 in response to the rigid traditionalism of the official government-sponsored Salon.

George Estrel Rasetti's works were part of the painting event in the art competition at both the 1924 Summer Olympics in Paris, France, as well as in the 1928 Summer Olympics in Amsterdam, the Netherlands. The painting Rasetti submitted to the 1928 Amsterdam Olympics was an oil on canvas painting called Cross-country that was 80 x 117 cm. This international multi-sport event was celebrated from 28 July to 12 August 1928. In addition to sports, the Olympic Games at that time also included art competitions in five categories: architecture, painting, sculpture, literature, and poetry.

His father Georges Rasetti died on 22 July 1938 at the age of 87. During World War II, Georges Estrel Rasetti continued to live at 6 rue Choron, in Paris France. His mother Celine Chaudet died during World War II on 5 May 1941. After the death of his uncle Louis Maurice Chaudet in 1945, Georges Estrel Rasetti lived in one of the apartments at 6 rue Choron in Paris with Élisabeth Chaudet, who was his uncle Maurice Chaude's widow.

After World War II, he sold 6 rue Choron, Paris, in viager and moved to Sclos de Contes, France, with Élisabeth Chaudet to devote himself to painting. Sclos de Contes is a part of the village of Contes, France, in the Alpes-Maritimes department of France, within the region of Provence-Alpes-Côte d'Azur in south-eastern France about 18 kilometers north and a little west of Nice, France.

After departing Paris for Sclos de Contes, the new owner of 6 rue Choron in Paris was left with many belongings that Rasetti did not take with him. When cleaning 6 rue Choron, the new owner of the building discarded many items of Rasetti's, including inadvertently discarding photographic plates of Paul Gauguin's paintings that Rasetti had left behind.

After Élisabeth Chaudet died, Georges Estrel Rasetti continued to live in Sclos de Contes until his death on 6 November 1957, which was caused by an electric blanket that short circuited and caused a fire. In addition to killing Rasetti, the fire also consumed several Paul Gauguin and Vincent van Gogh paintings that Rasetti possessed that were stored under his bed at the time of the fire.

Georges Estrel Rasetti's works include: Le vallon, Le parc maison à Bréchaille à Chatou, Paysage de Provence, La vielle usine à Maillot, Ferme dans un paysage, Ferme en Bretagne, Le Zinc, Maison à Épernon, Femmes au champs ramasseuses de pommes de terre, Concours de Pêche, Les Rochers Rouges, Paysages, Paysages au verger, and others.

== Personal life ==
Georges Estrel Rasetti was the son of painter and ceramicist, Georges Joseph Rasetti (1851 to 1938). His mother, wife of Georges Joseph Rasetti, was Céline Constance Alexandrone Chaudet (15 April 1863 to 5 May 1941).

Céline Chaudet's brother, Georges Alfred Chaudet, was a painter, photographer and art dealer for Paul Gauguin. Georges Chaudet died in 1899. Georges Chaudet was a member of the Société des Artistes Français, with whom he exhibited. Georges Chaudet met Gauguin in the Breton village of Douarnenez, in Brittany, France, and became Gauguin's friend and art dealer until Chaudet's death.
