= Paul Sérusier =

French painter (1864–1927)

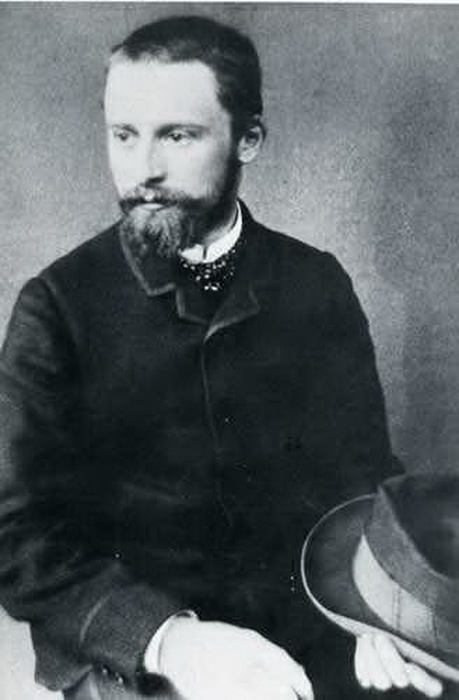
- Born: 9 November 1864; Paris, France
- Died: 7 October 1927 (aged 62); Morlaix, France
- Education: Académie Julian
- Known for: Painting
- Movement: Post-Impressionism

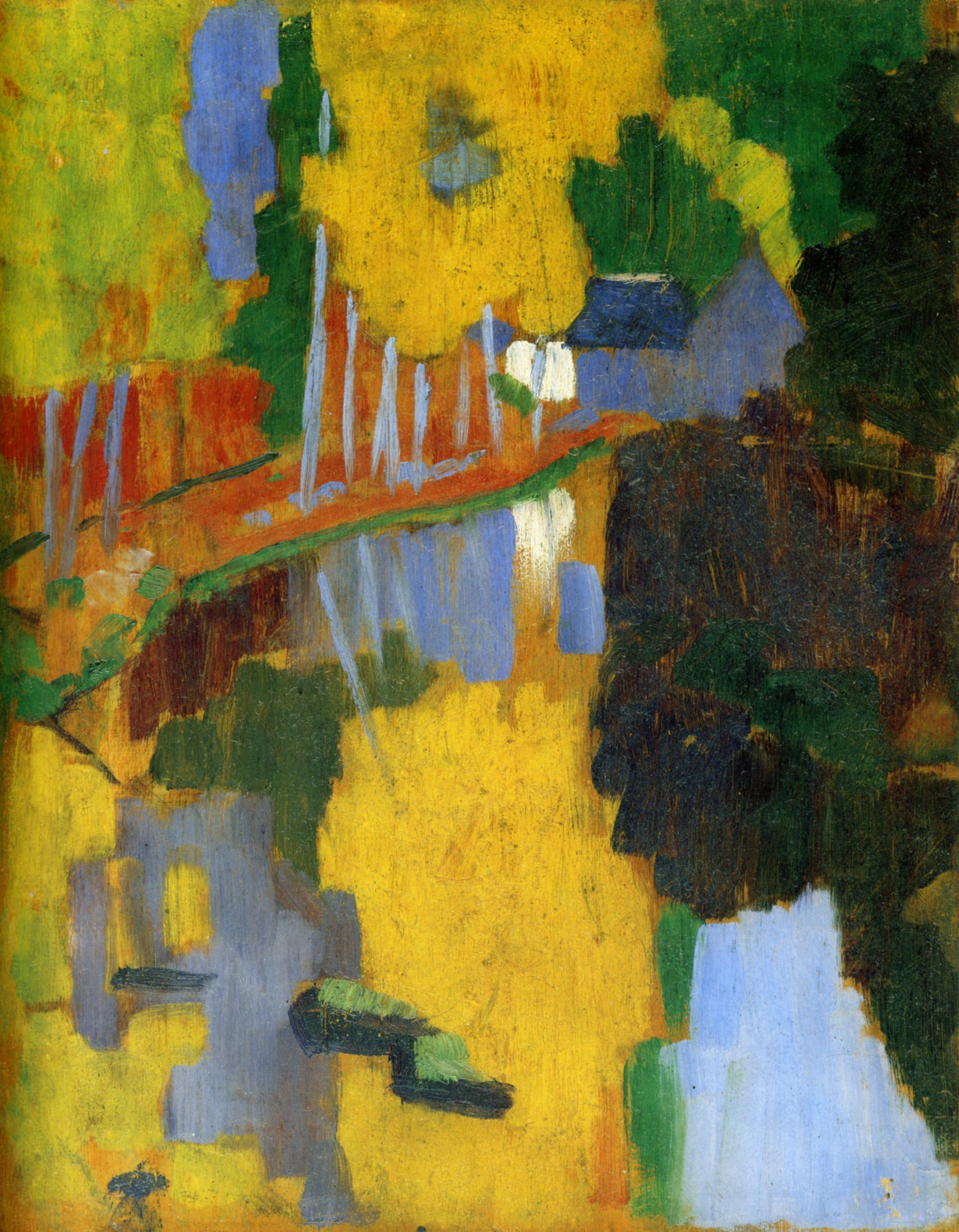
Paul Sérusier, The Talisman (1888); oil on wood, 27 x 21.5 cm. Musée d'Orsay, Paris

Paul Sérusier (French: [seʁyzje]; 9 November 1864 – 7 October 1927) was a French painter who was a pioneer of abstract art and an inspiration for the avant-garde Nabis movement, Synthetism and Cloisonnism.

== Education ==
Sérusier was born in Paris. He studied at the Académie Julian and was a monitor there in the mid-1880s. In the summer of 1888 he travelled to Pont-Aven and joined the small group of artists centered there around Paul Gauguin. While at the Pont-Aven artist's colony he painted a picture that became known as The Talisman, under the close supervision of Gauguin. The picture was an extreme exercise in Cloisonnism that approximated to pure abstraction. He was a Post-Impressionist painter, a part of the group of painters called Les Nabis. Sérusier, along with Paul Gauguin, named the group. Pierre Bonnard, Édouard Vuillard and Maurice Denis became the best known of the group, but at the time they were somewhat peripheral to the core group.

In 1892 Sérusier met and befriended Charles Hodge Mackie while the Scottish artist and his wife were honeymooning in France. This friendship led to him contributing the illustration Pastorale Bretonne to The Evergreen: A Northern Seasonal: The Book of Spring published by Patrick Geddes and Colleagues in Edinburgh in 1895.

He later taught at the Académie Ranson and published his book ABC de la peinture in 1921. He died at Morlaix in Brittany.

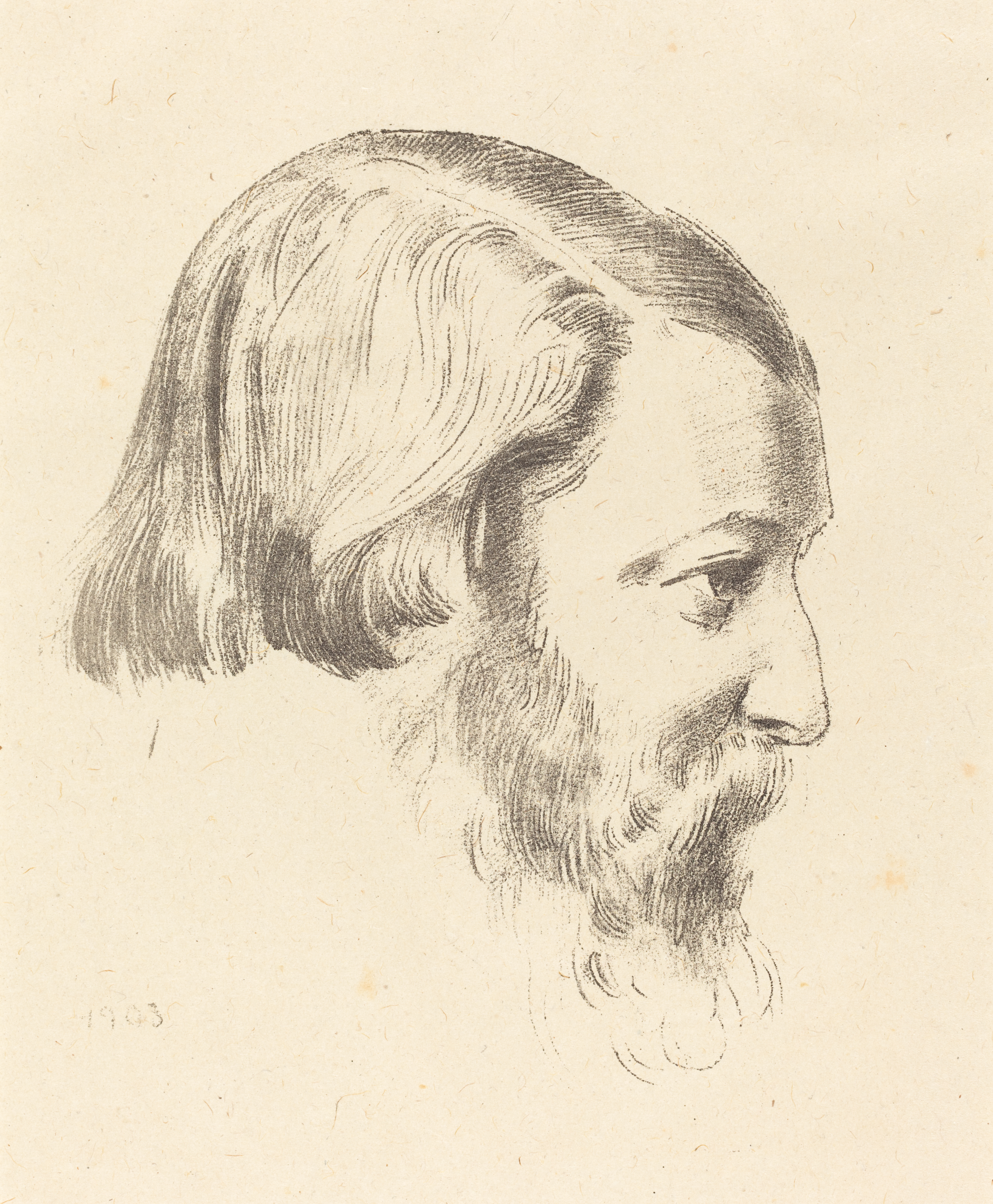
Odilon Redon, Paul Serusier, 1903, lithograph. Rosenwald Collection, National Gallery of Art, Washington, 1958.8.197

== Writings ==
- ABC de la peinture, La Douce France & Henri Floury, Paris 1921

- Second edition, accompanied by a study on Sérusier's life and work, by Maurice Denis, Librairie Floury, Paris 1942
- Third edition, accompanied by an unpublished correspondence, collected by Madame P. Sérusier and annotated by Mademoiselle H. Boutaric, Librairie Floury, Paris 1950

== Gallery ==
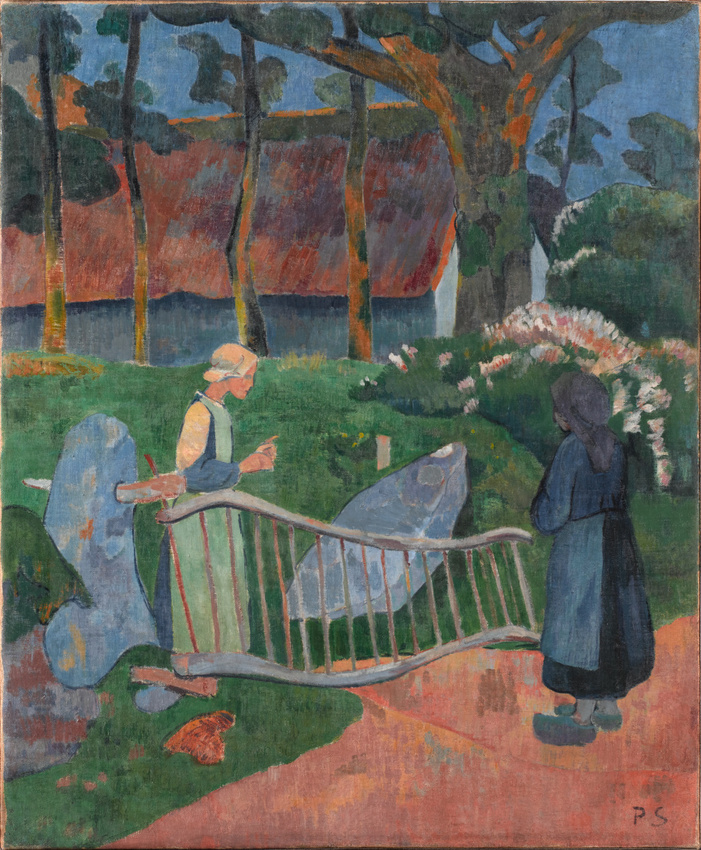
Sérusier, 1889, The flowered barrier, Le Pouldu in Pont-Aven, oil on cardboard

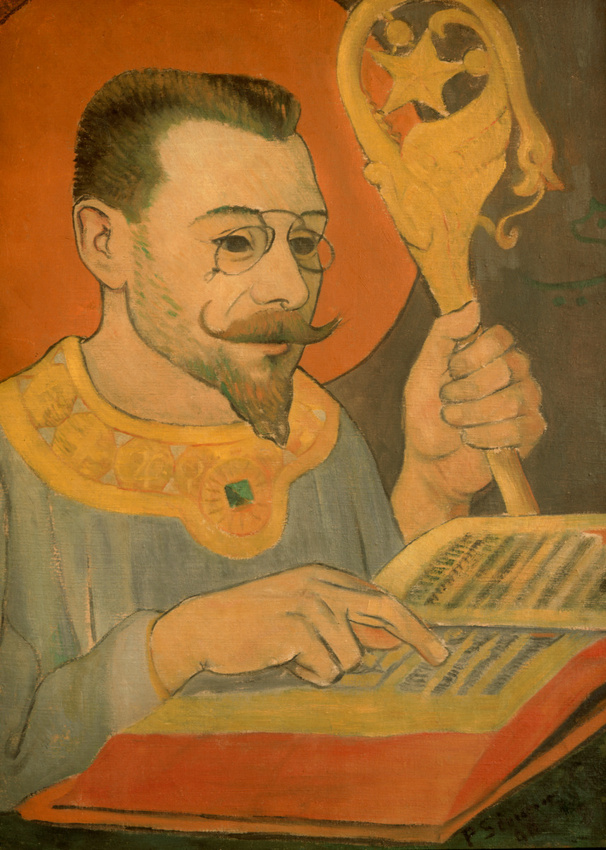
Sérusier, 1890, Portrait of Paul Ranson, oil on canvas, Musée d'Orsay

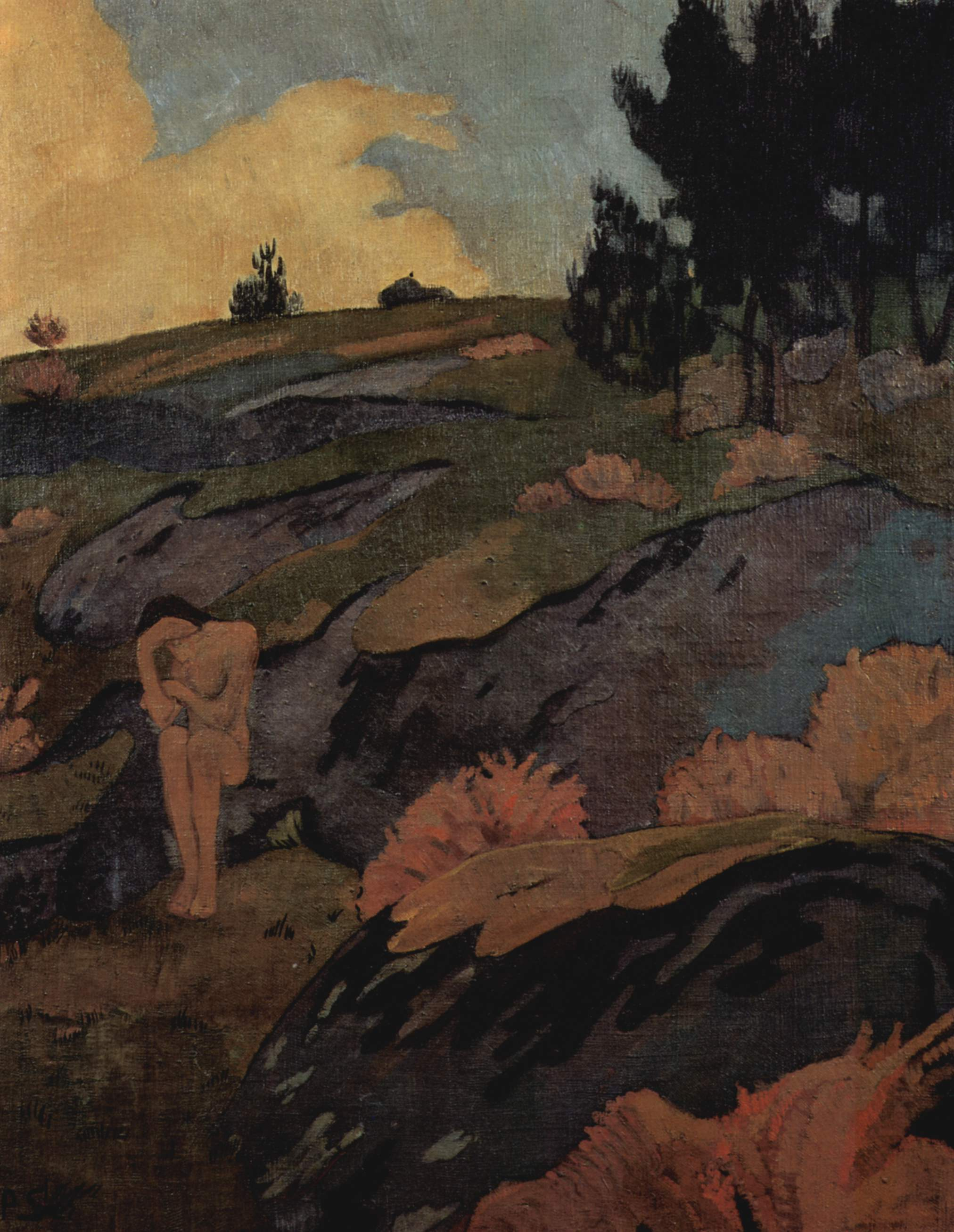
Sérusier, 1890, Melancholy, oil on canvas

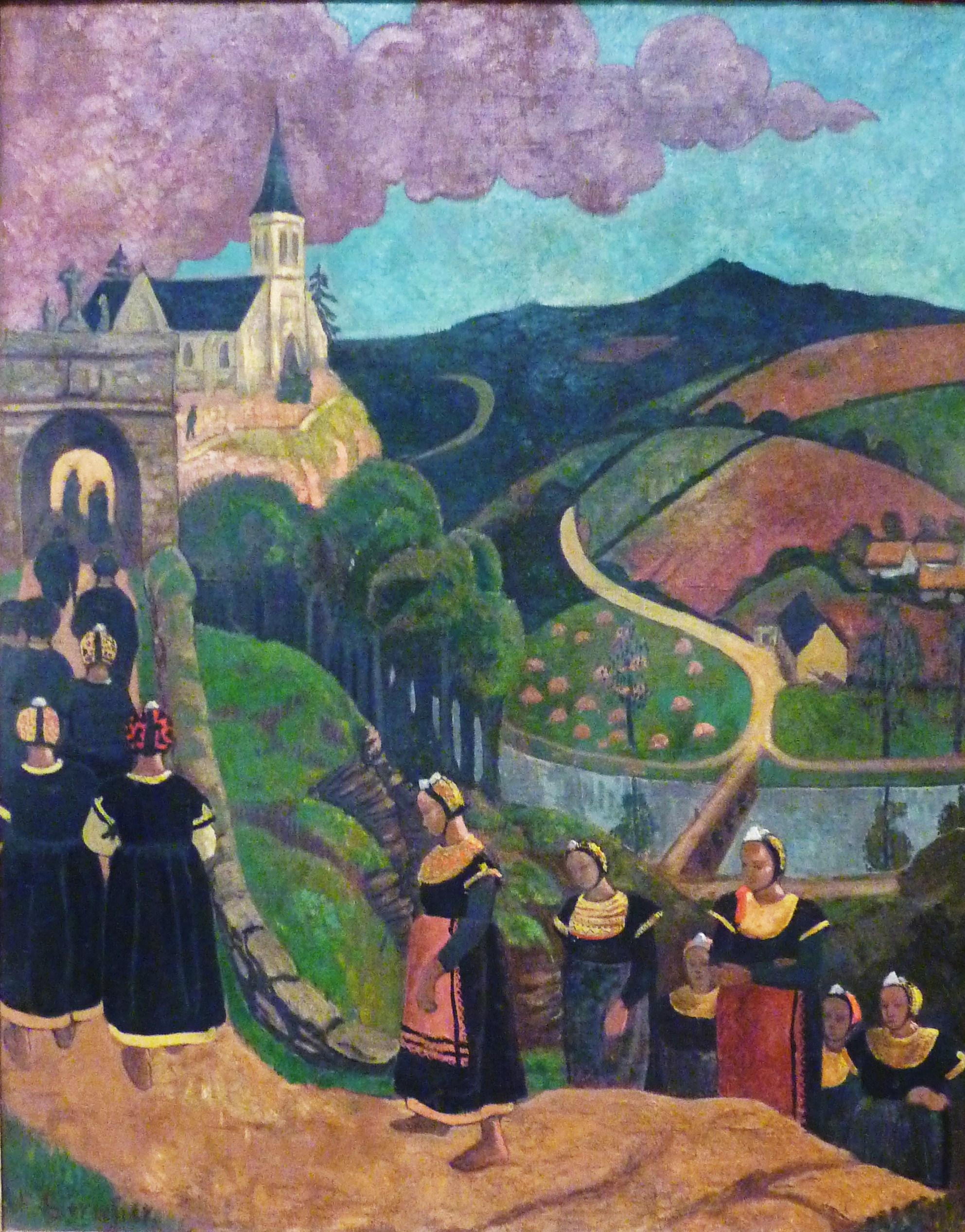
Sérusier, c. 1894, Le pardon de Notre-Dame-des-Portes à Châteauneuf-du-Faou, oil painting, Musée d'Orsay

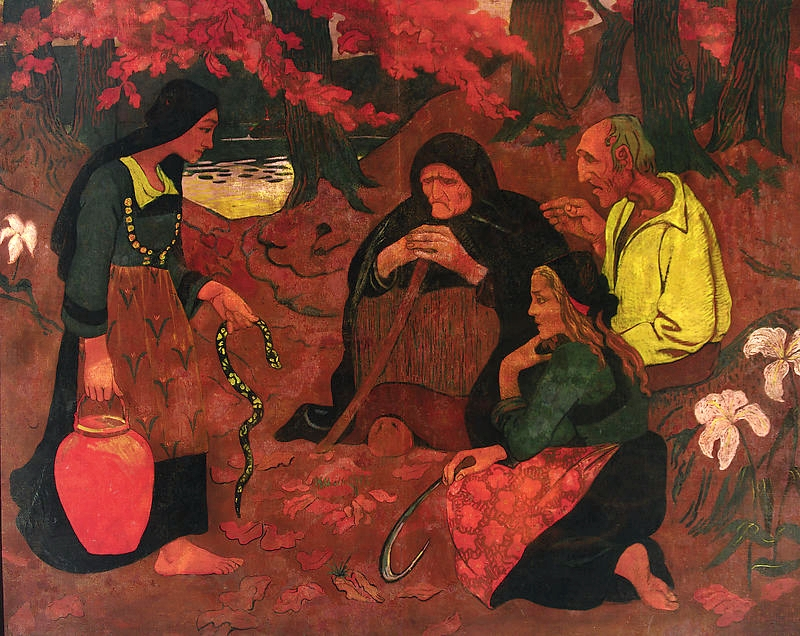
Sérusier, 1894, The snake eaters (Les mangeurs de serpents), tempera on canvas, National Museum, Warsaw

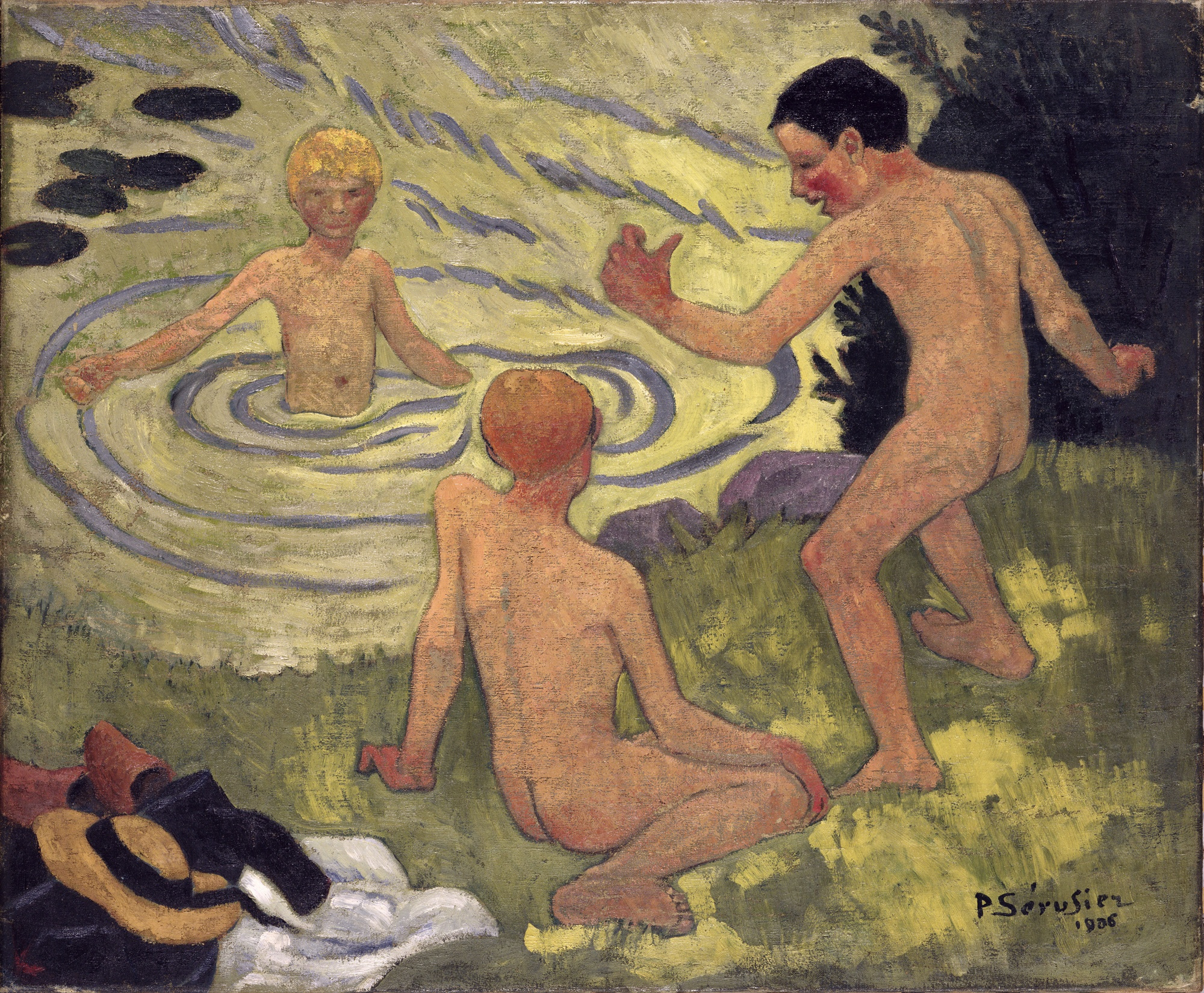
Sérusier, 1906, Boys on a Riverbank, oil on canvas, National Gallery of Victoria

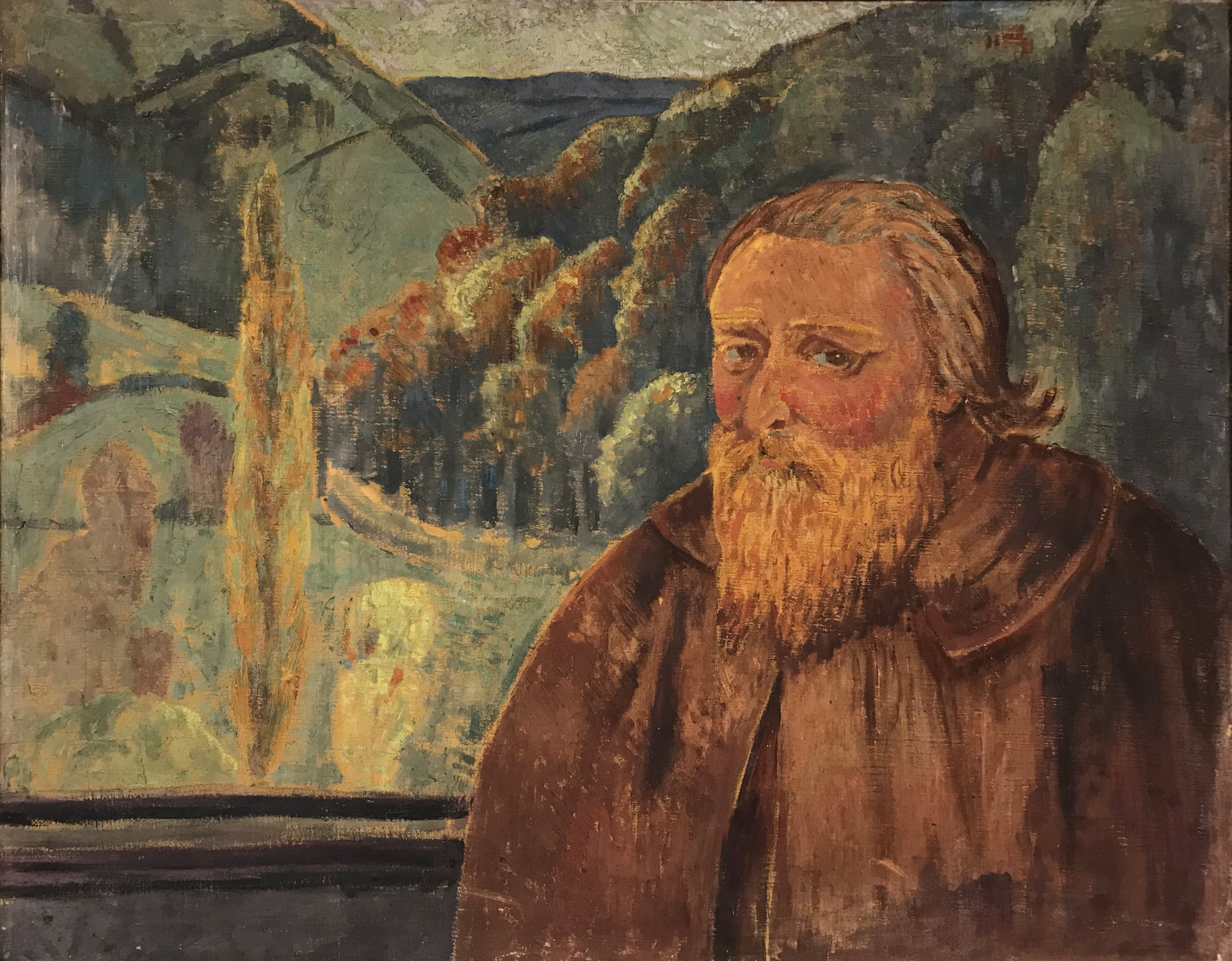
Sérusier, 1907–08, Self-portrait with a shiny beard (Autoportrait à la barbe rutilante), oil on canvas

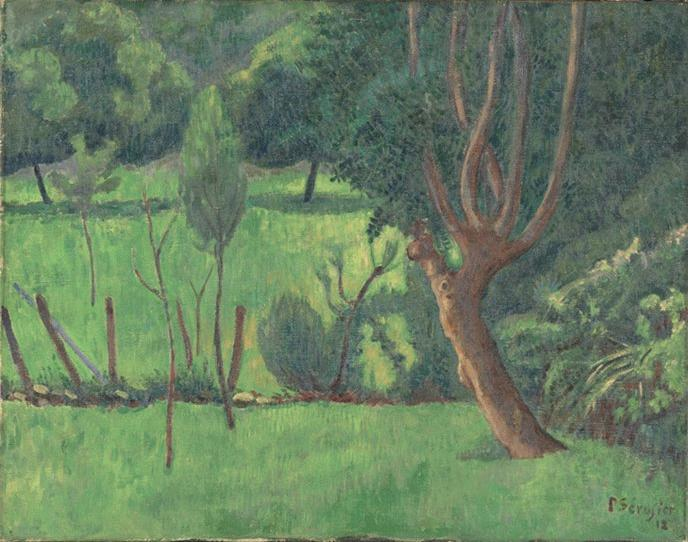
Sérusier, 1912, Landscape, oil on canvas, Musée d'Orsay

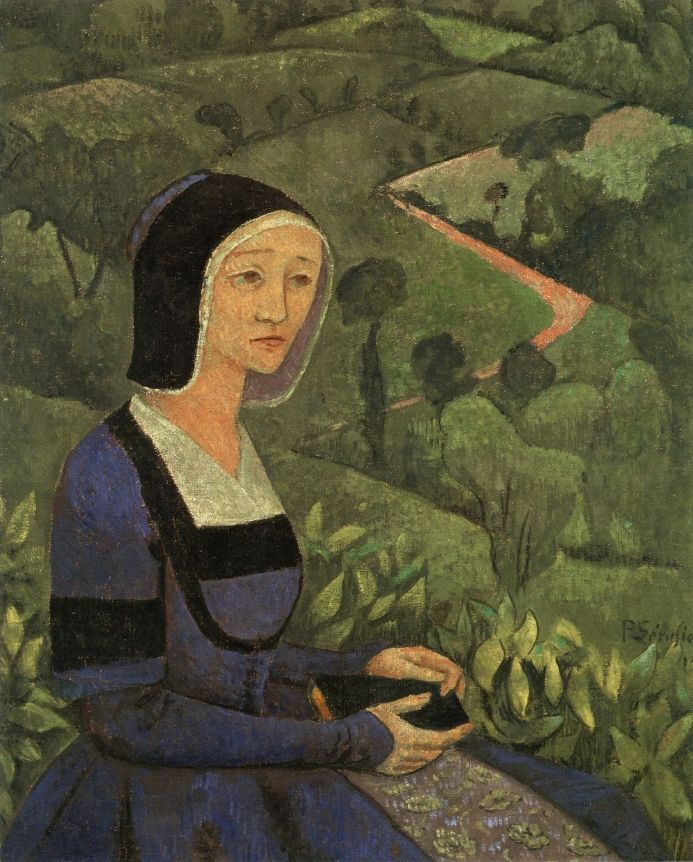
Sérusier, 1919, The War Widow (La veuve de Guerre), oil on canvas

== References and sources ==
Sources

- Gauguin and the Nabis: Prophets of Modernism by Arthur Ellridge. Terrail, 1995.
- The Nabis: Bonnard, Vuillard and Their Circle by Claire Freches-Thory (Author), Antoine Terrasse (Author). Flammarion, 2003.
- The Nabis and the Parisian Avant-Garde by Patricia Eckert Boyer (Editor), Jane Voorhees Zimmerli Art Museum, Elizabeth Prelinger. Rutgers University Press, 1988.
- The Nabis and Their Period by Charles Chassé. Lund Humphries, 1969.
- The Nabis, Their History and Their Art, 1888–1896 by George Mauner. Garland Publishing, 1978.
- Frèches-Thory, Claire, & Perucchi-Petry, Ursula, ed.: Die Nabis: Propheten der Moderne, Kunsthaus Zürich & Grand Palais, Paris & Prestel, Munich 1993 ISBN 3-7913-1969-8 (German), (French)
