= Paul Ranson =

French painter and writer (1861–1909)

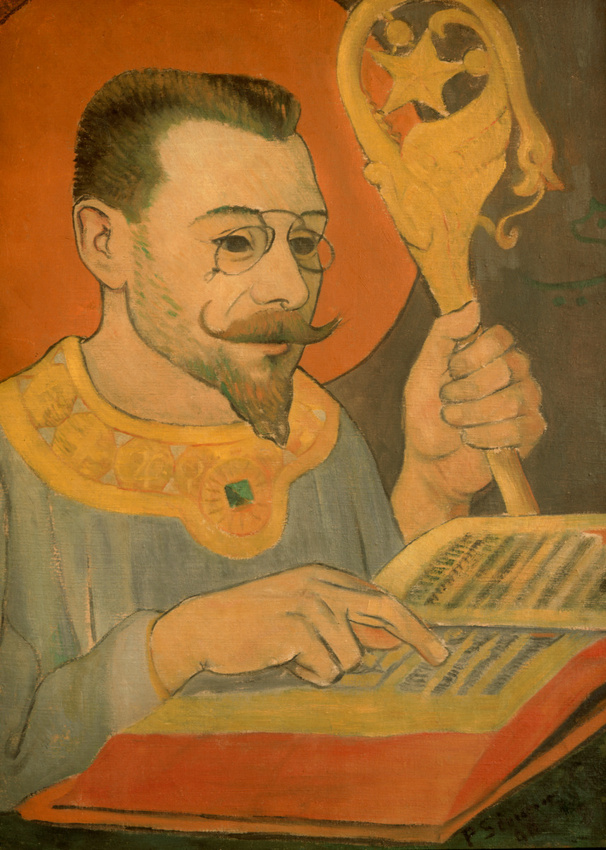
Portrait of Paul Ranson by Paul Sérusier (1890)

Paul-Élie Ranson (French pronunciation: [pɔl eli ʁɑ̃sɔ̃]; 29 March 1861 – 20 February 1909) was a French painter and writer associated with Les Nabis.

== Biography ==
He was born in Limoges. His mother died in childbirth, so he was raised and educated by his grandparents and his father, Louis Casimir Ranson, a politician who served two terms as Mayor of Limoges. He received his first drawing lessons from his grandfather, Jean-Jacques Maquart, and was enrolled at the École des Beaux-Arts Appliqués à l'Industrie in 1877.

In 1884, he married his first cousin, Marie-France Rousseau, and studied for a time at the École Nationale Supérieure des Arts Décoratifs before transferring to the Académie Julian, where he studied with Tony Robert-Fleury from 1886 to 1891. In 1888, he became one of the five founding members of "Les Nabis", a group that played a large role in the transition from Impressionism to the various styles of Modern art. His fellow founders were Paul Sérusier, Henri-Gabriel Ibels, Pierre Bonnard, and Maurice Denis.

Ranson's work was significantly shaped by Japonisme—the widespread European fascination with Japanese art—and he was considered by contemporaries as highly influenced by Japanese woodblock prints, earning him the informal distinction of being “the Nabi more Japanese than the Japanese Nabi,” referring to Bonnard.

In 1891, he participated in the Symbolist performances at the Théâtre d'Art, where the poet, Paul Fort, was organizing shows to benefit his fellow poet Paul Verlaine and Paul Gauguin. In 1892, he directed a performance of Ubu Roi by Alfred Jarry at the Théâtre des Pantins.

He also participated in group exhibitions organized by Le Barc de Boutteville, held from 1891 to 1895, as well as at the Salon des indépendants and the Salon de la Libre Esthétique in Brussels after 1894. That same year, he was able to indulge his life-long interest in puppetry by opening a theater, with puppets made by Georges Lacombe. He encountered some difficulties not long after, however, when the death of his stepfather, Charles Rousseau, forced him and Marie to support their own apartment.

Ranson's interest in Theosophy, magic and occultism came to set him apart from his fellow Nabis. In 1898, Marie's pregnancy brought more difficulties, as he resented losing his favorite model and frequent collaborator to the duties of motherhood. After 1899, his health began to deteriorate and his paintings changed, coming to focus on mythology, witchcraft and anti-clerical subjects.

In 1908, seeing him faced with serious physical and financial problems, his friends in Les Nabis created the Académie Ranson, and entrusted him with its management. Marie took over after his death and it survived, in various forms, until 1955.

Ranson died of typhoid fever in 1909 in Paris and was buried in Limoges.

== Selected paintings ==
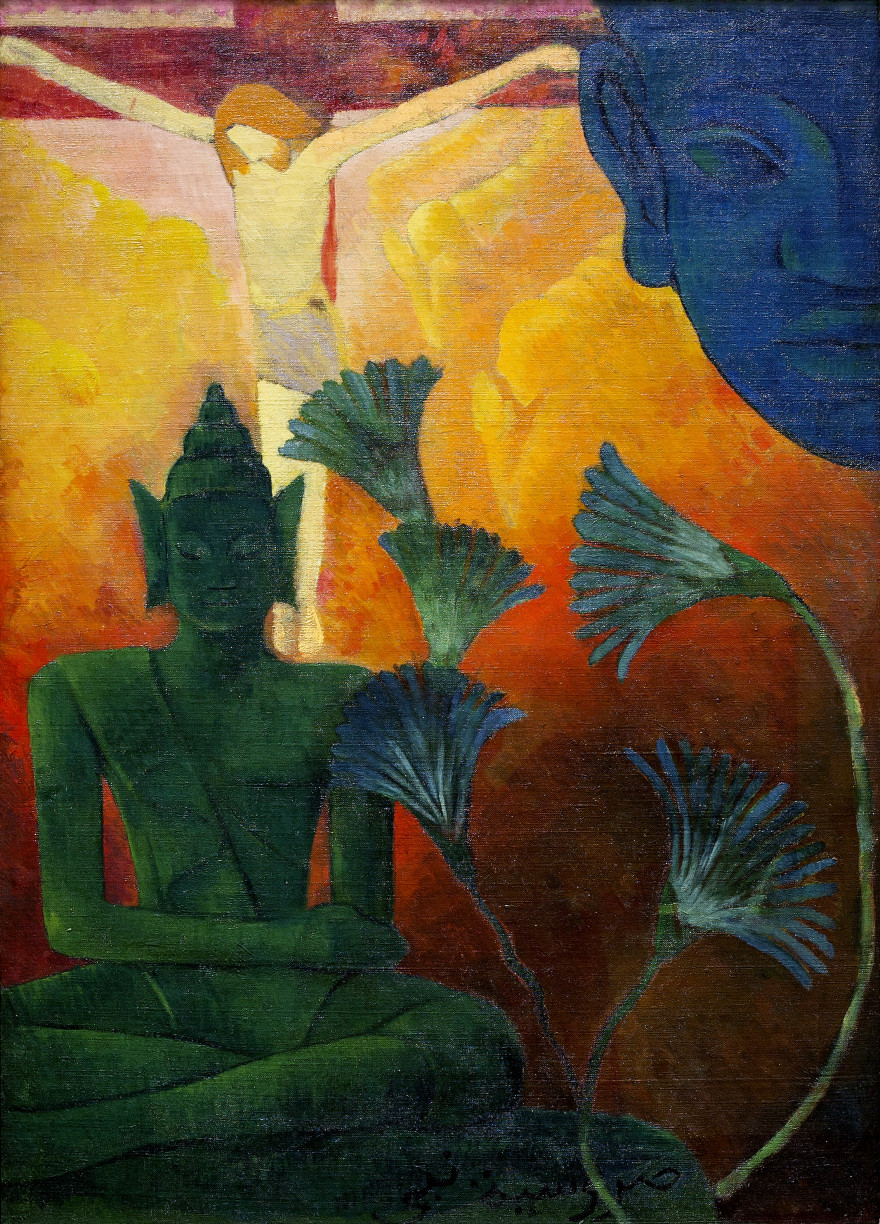
Christ and Buddha, (1880)

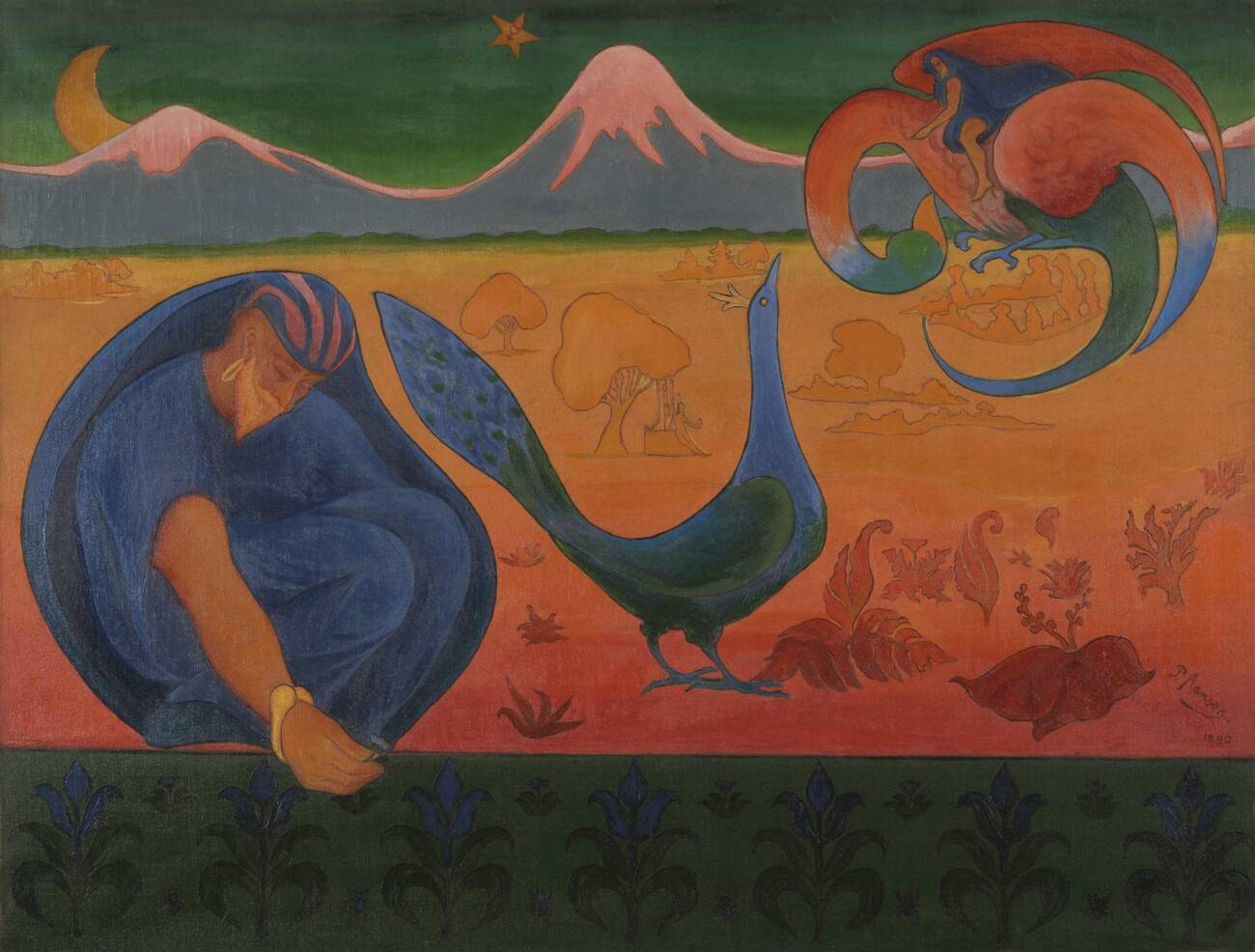
Nabis Landscape, (1890)

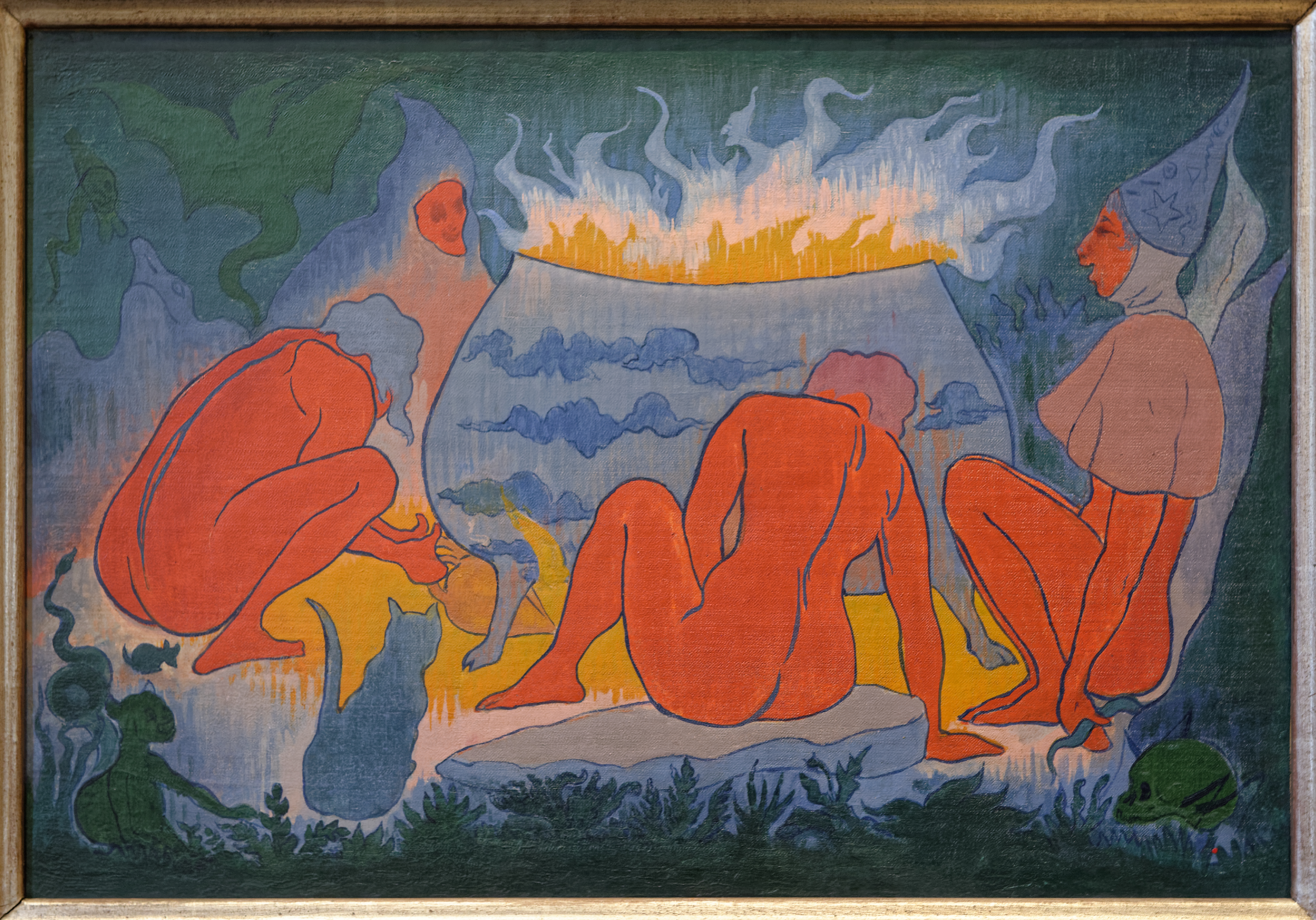
Witches Around the Fire, (1891)

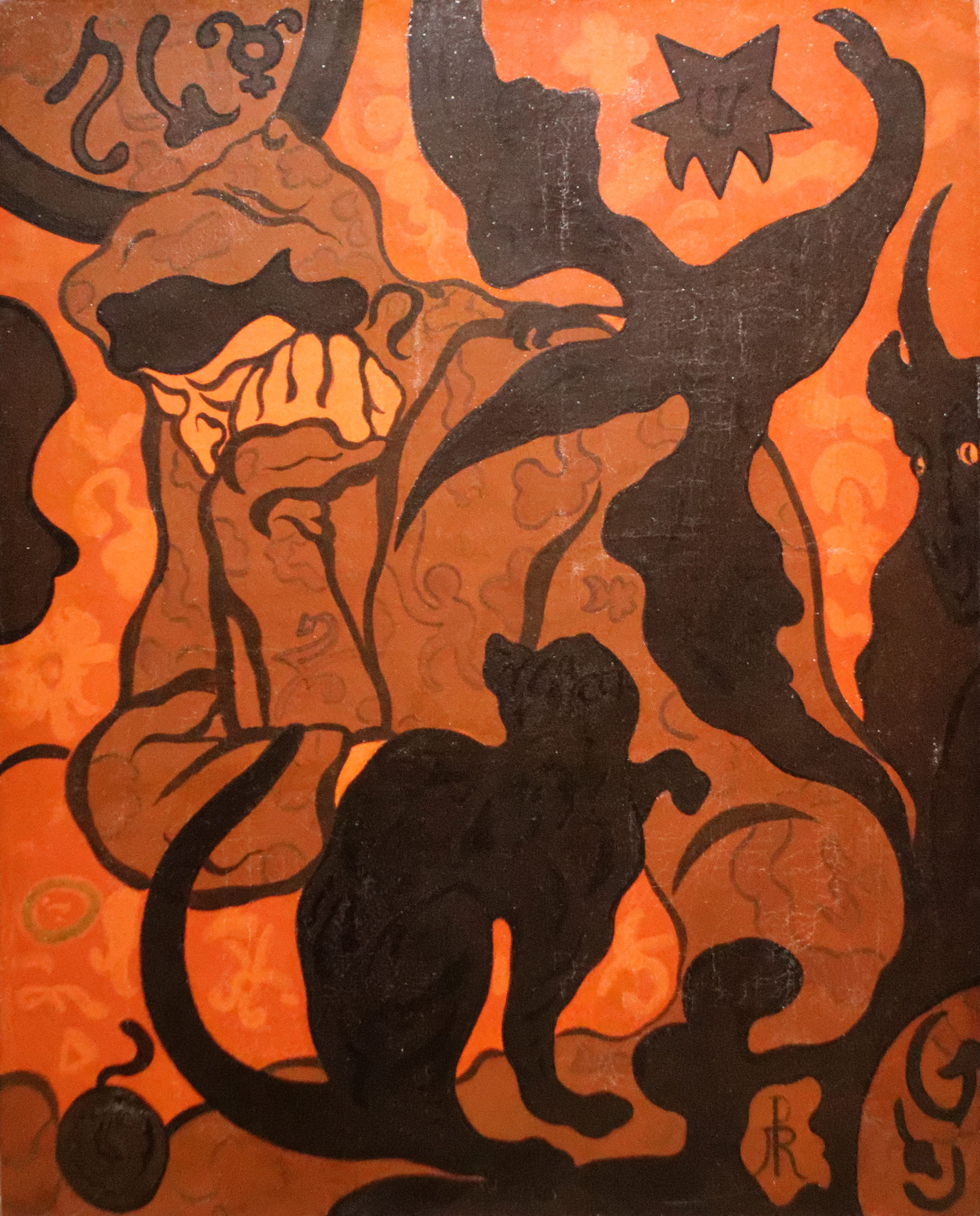
Witch with a Black Cat, (1893)

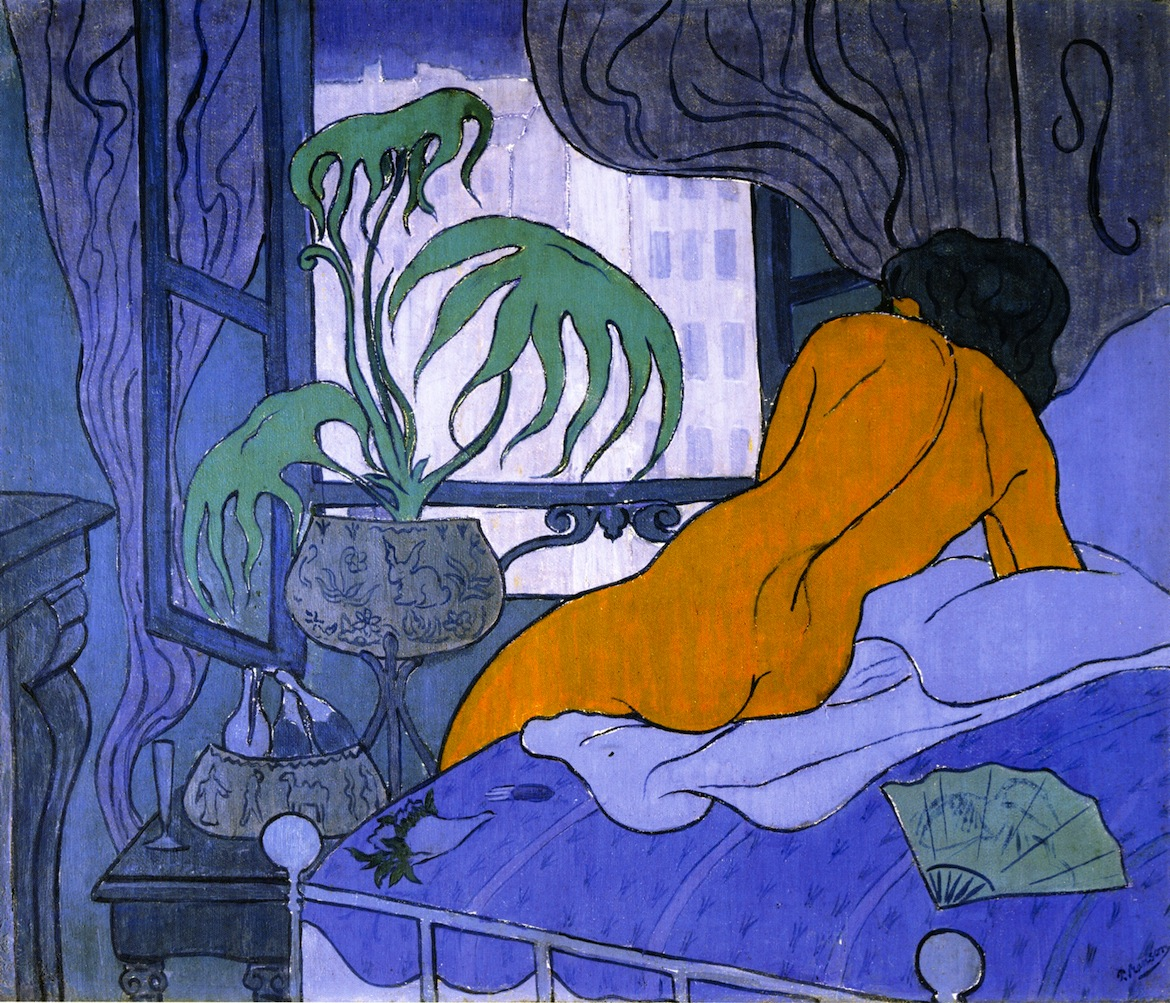
The Blue Room, (c. 1900)

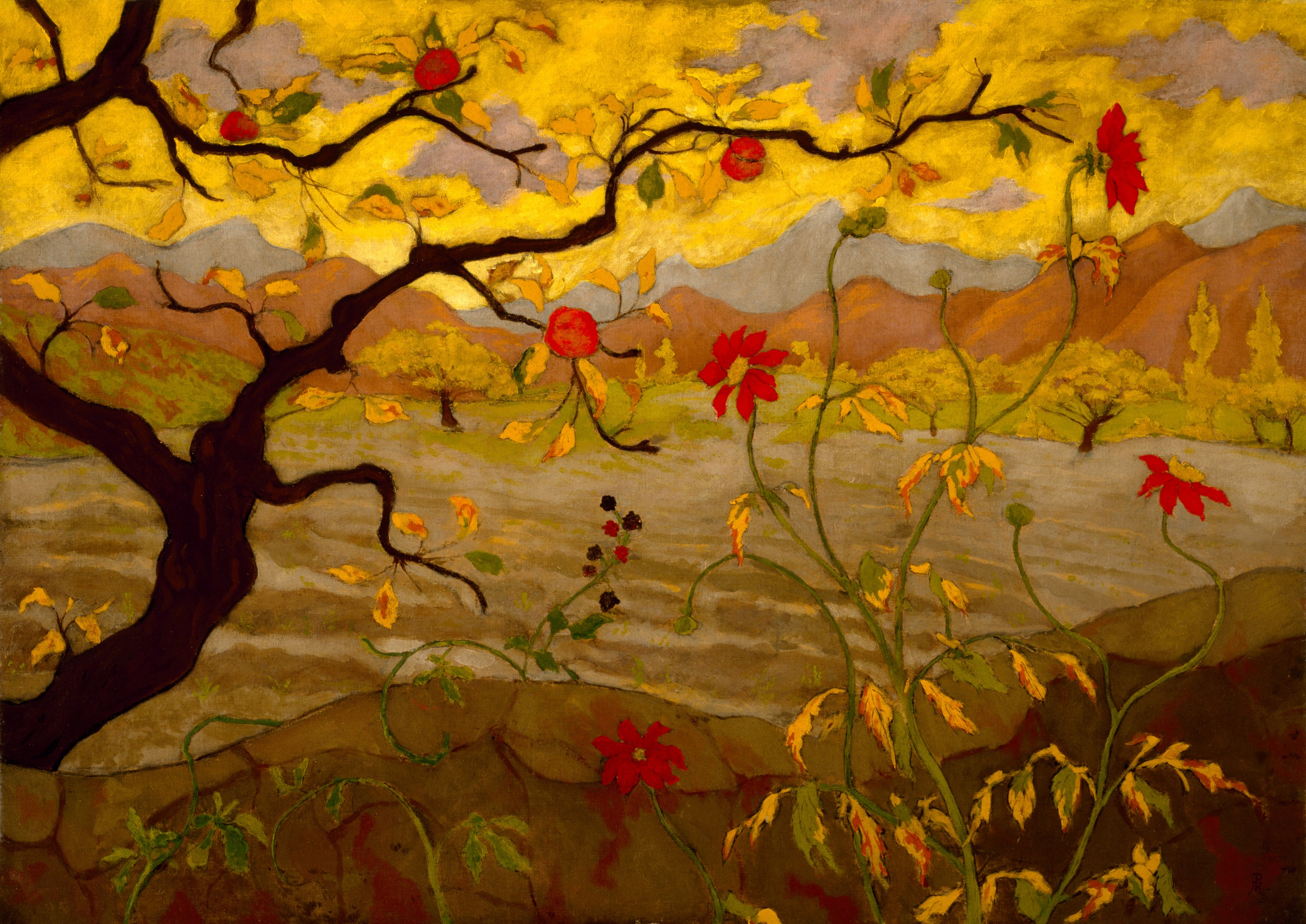
Apple Tree with Red Berries, (1902)

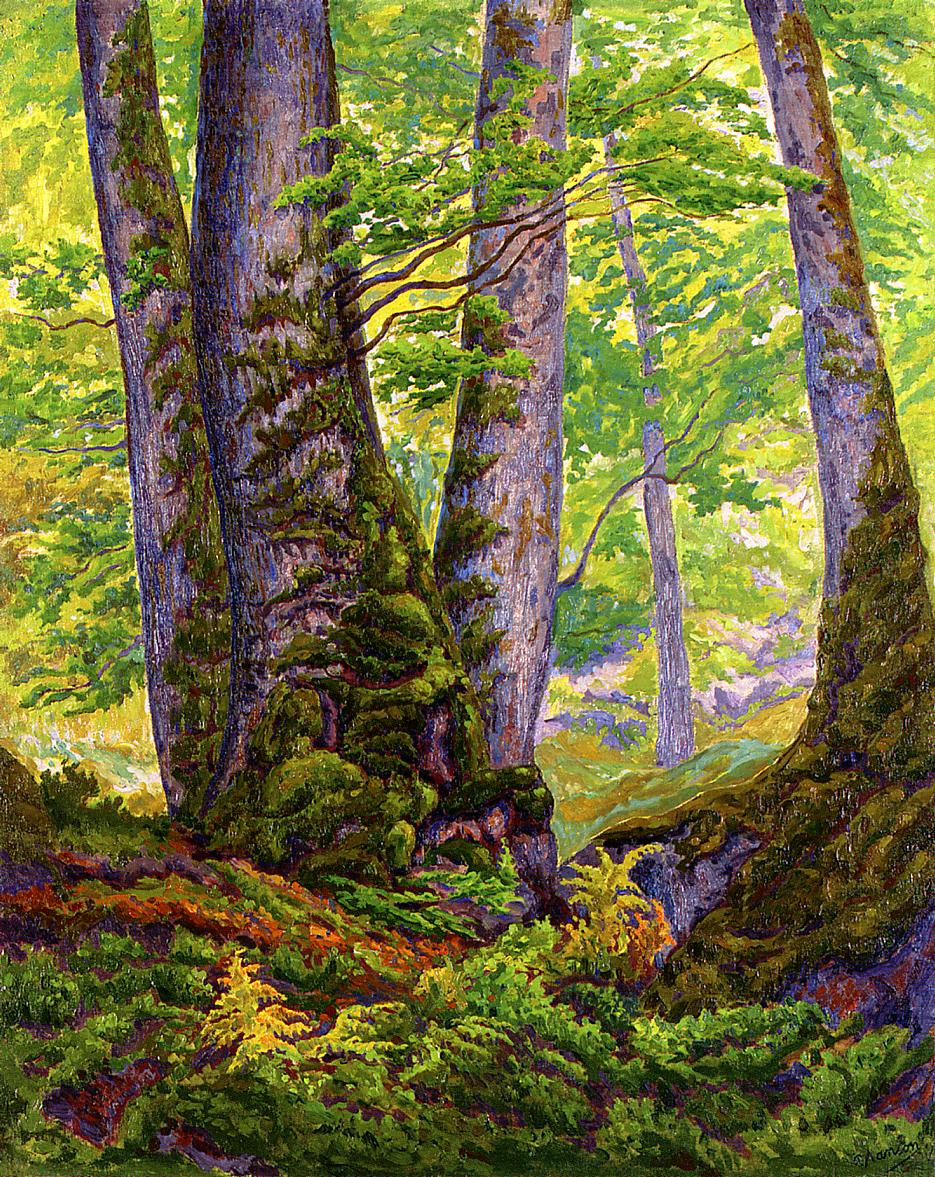
Three Beeches, (1905)
