= Georges Chaudet =

French painter and art dealer

- Born: 1870; Paris, France
- Died: 1899 (aged 28–29)
- Citizenship: Paris, France
- Occupations: Photographer, painter, art dealer

Georges Chaudet (1870–1899) was a French photographer and painter. He was associated with the Pont-Aven School, and he was one of Paul Gauguin's original art agents/dealers from 1895 to 1898. One of his paintings is at the Musée des Beaux-Arts de Brest.

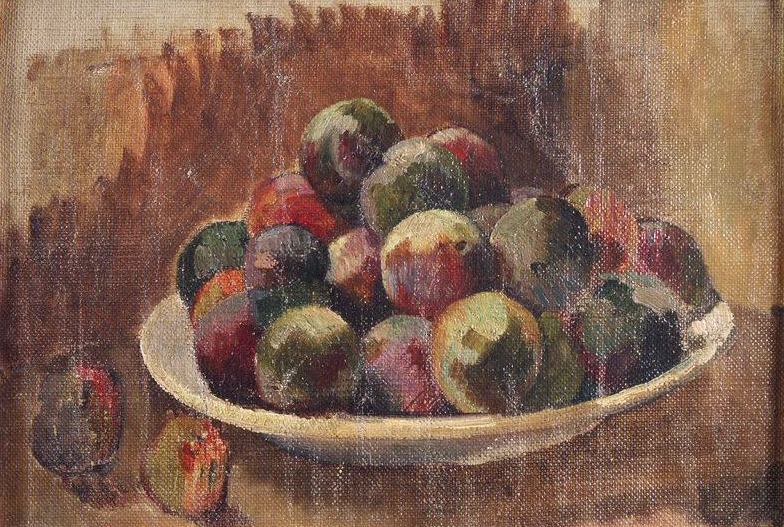
Nature morte à l'assiette de pommes.

== See also ==
- Provenance
