= Oviri =

1894 ceramic sculpture by Paul Gauguin

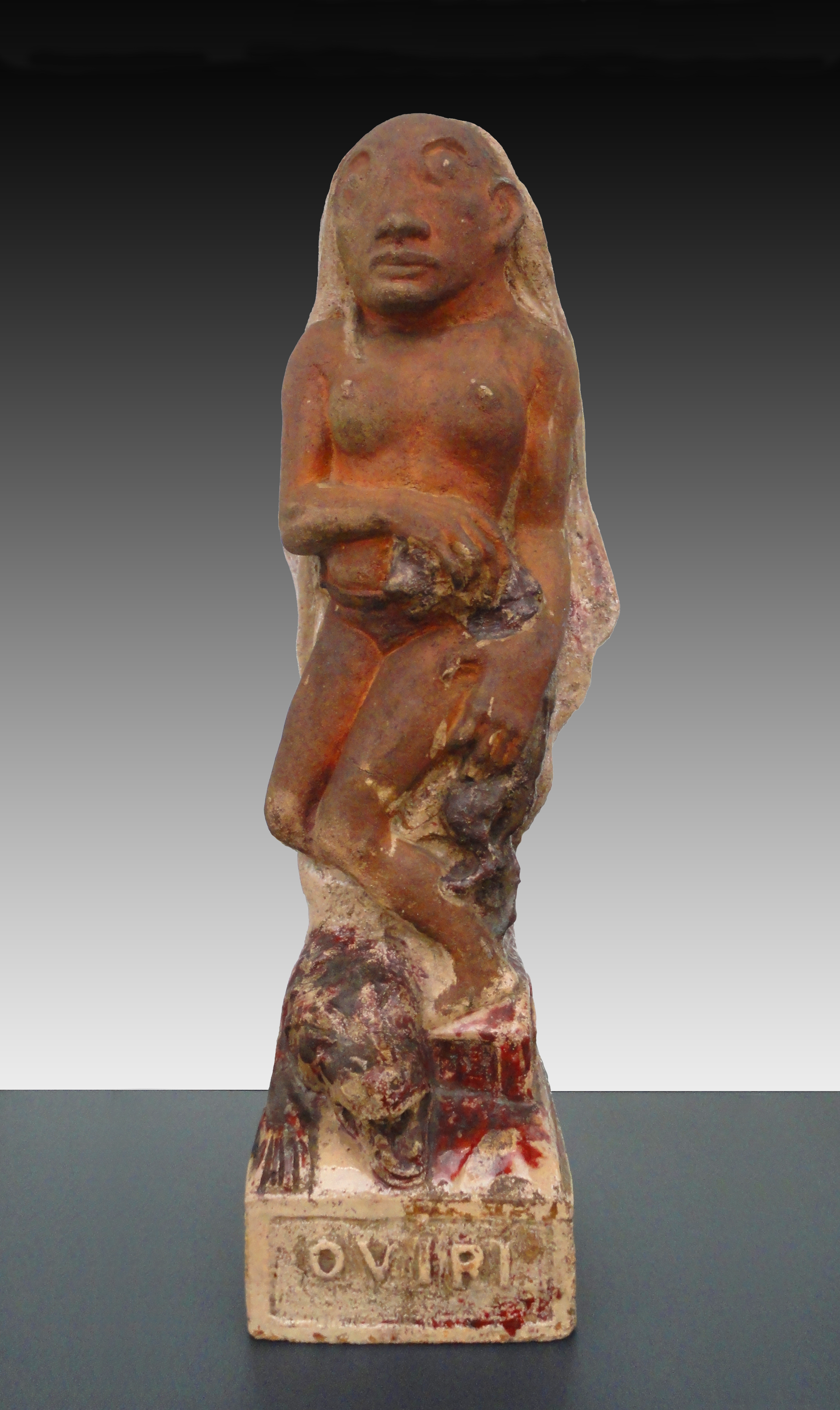
Paul Gauguin, Oviri (Sauvage), 1894, partially glazed stoneware, 75 × 19 × 27 cm (29.5 × 7.5 × 10.6 in), Musée d'Orsay, Paris

Oviri (Tahitian for savage or wild) is an 1894 ceramic sculpture by the French artist Paul Gauguin. In Tahitian mythology, Oviri was the goddess of mourning and is shown with long pale hair and wild eyes, smothering a wolf with her feet while clutching a cub in her arms. Art historians have presented multiple interpretations—usually that Gauguin intended it as an epithet to reinforce his self-image as a "civilised savage". Tahitian goddesses of her era had passed from folk memory by 1894, yet Gauguin romanticises the island's past as he reaches towards more ancient sources, including an Assyrian relief of a "master of animals" type and Majapahit mummies. Other possible influences include preserved skulls from the Marquesas Islands, figures found at Borobudur, and a 9th-century Mahayana Buddhist temple in central Java.

Gauguin made three casts, each in partially glazed stoneware, and while several copies exist in plaster or bronze, the original cast is in the Musée d'Orsay. His sales of the casts were not successful, and at a low financial and personal ebb he asked for one to be placed on his grave. There are only three other surviving comments of his on the figure: he described the figure as a strange and cruel enigma on an 1895 presentation mount of two impressions of a woodcut of Oviri for Stéphane Mallarmé; he referred to it as La Tueuse ("The Murderess") in an 1897 letter to Ambroise Vollard; and he appended an inscription referencing Honoré de Balzac's novel Séraphîta in a c. 1899 drawing. Oviri was exhibited at the 1906 Salon d'Automne (no. 57) where it influenced Pablo Picasso, who based one of the figures in Les Demoiselles d'Avignon on it.

== Background ==
Gauguin was foremost a painter; he came to ceramics around 1886, when he was taught by the French sculptor and ceramist Ernest Chaplet. They had been introduced by Félix Bracquemond who, inspired by the new French art pottery, was experimenting with the form. During that winter of 1886–87, Gauguin visited Chaplet's workshop at Vaugirard, where they collaborated on stoneware pots with applied figures or ornamental fragments and multiple handles.

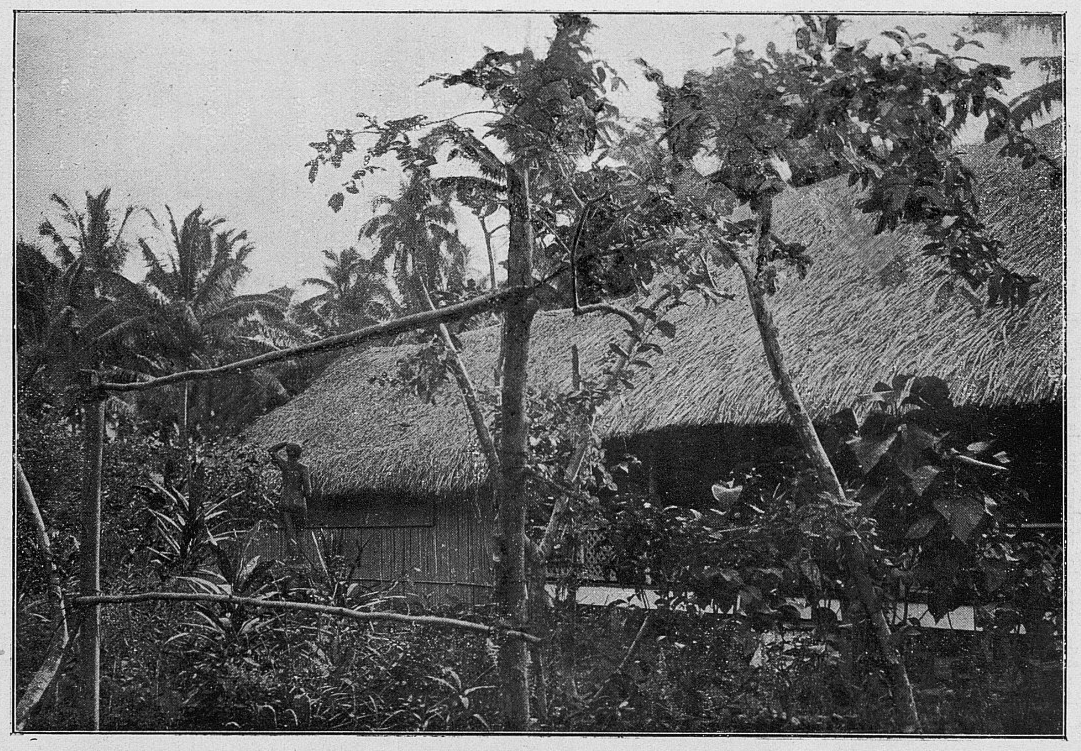
Jules Agostini's 1896 photograph of Gauguin's house in Puna'auia, French Polynesia

Gauguin first visited Tahiti in 1891 and, attracted by the beauty of Tahitian women, undertook a set of sculptural mask-like portraits on paper. They evoke both melancholy and death, and conjure the state of faaturuma (brooding or melancholy); imagery and moods later used in the Oviri ceramic. Gauguin's first wood carvings in Tahiti were with a guava wood that quickly crumbled and have not survived.

He completed Oviri in the winter of 1894, during his return from Tahiti, and submitted it to the Société Nationale des Beaux-Arts 1895 salon opening in April the following year. There are two versions of what ensued: Charles Morice claimed in 1920 that Gauguin was "literally expelled" from the exhibition; in 1937 Ambroise Vollard wrote that the piece was admitted only when Chaplet threatened to withdraw his own works in protest. According to Bengt Danielsson, Gauguin was keen to increase his public exposure and availed of this opportunity by writing an outraged letter to Le Soir, bemoaning the state of modern ceramics.

At the outset of 1897, Vollard addressed a letter to Gauguin about the possibility of casting his sculptures in bronze. Gauguin's response centred on Oviri:

I believe that my large statue in ceramic, the Tueuse ("The Murderess"), is an exceptional piece such as no ceramist has made until now and that, in addition, it would look very well cast in bronze (without retouching and without patina). In this way the buyer would not only have the ceramic piece itself, but also a bronze edition with which to make money.

Art historian Christopher Gray mentions three plaster casts, the fissured surfaces of which suggest that they were taken from a prior undocumented wood carving no longer extant. One was given to Daniel Monfreid and now belongs to the Musée départemental Maurice Denis "The Priory" in Saint-Germain-en-Laye. Another version in plaster, with the surface finish of wood, was kept by Gustave Fayet, and subsequently formed part of the collection of his son, Léon. The third version was kept by the artist who made the casts. A number of bronzes were produced, including the version placed on Gauguin's grave at Atuona, cast by the Fondation Singer-Polignac and erected 29 March 1973.

== Description and sources ==
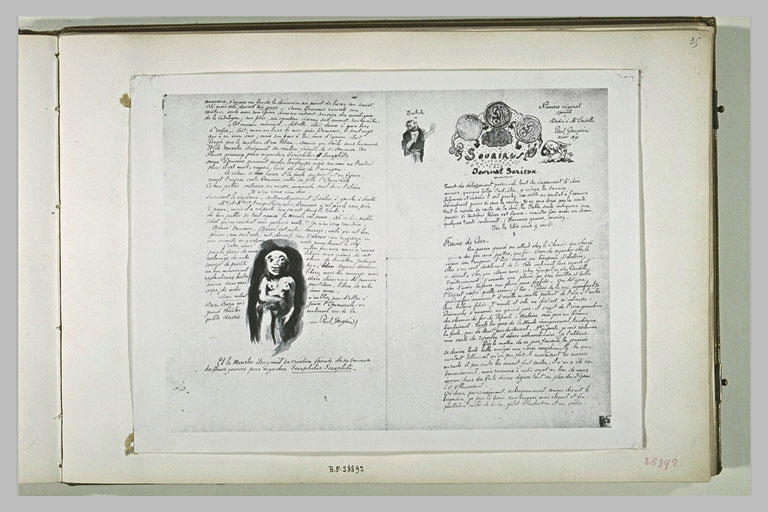
First issue of Le Sourire, Journal sérieux, 1899. Louvre, Cabinet des dessins

Oviri has long blonde or grey hair reaching to her knees. Her head and eyes are disproportionately large, while the aperture at the back of her head resembles a vaginal orifice. She holds a wolf cub to her hip, a symbol of her indifference and wild power. It is not clear whether Oviri is smothering or hugging the cub, but her pose invokes ideas of sacrifice, infanticide and the archetype of the vengeful mother, influenced by Eugène Delacroix's 1838 painting, Medea About to Kill Her Children. A second animal, likely another wolf, is at her feet either curling in submission or dead. Art historians including Sue Taylor suggest the second animal may represent Gauguin.

The association between the woman and a wolf stems from a remark Edgar Degas made defending Gauguin's work at the poorly received 1893 Durand-Ruel exhibition, when Degas quoted La Fontaine's fable The Dog and the Wolf, which is usually taken as implying that freedom should not be exchanged for comfort or financial gain: "You see, Gauguin is the wolf." In Oviri, the mature wolf, the European Gauguin, perishes while the whelp, the Gauguin of Tahiti, survives.

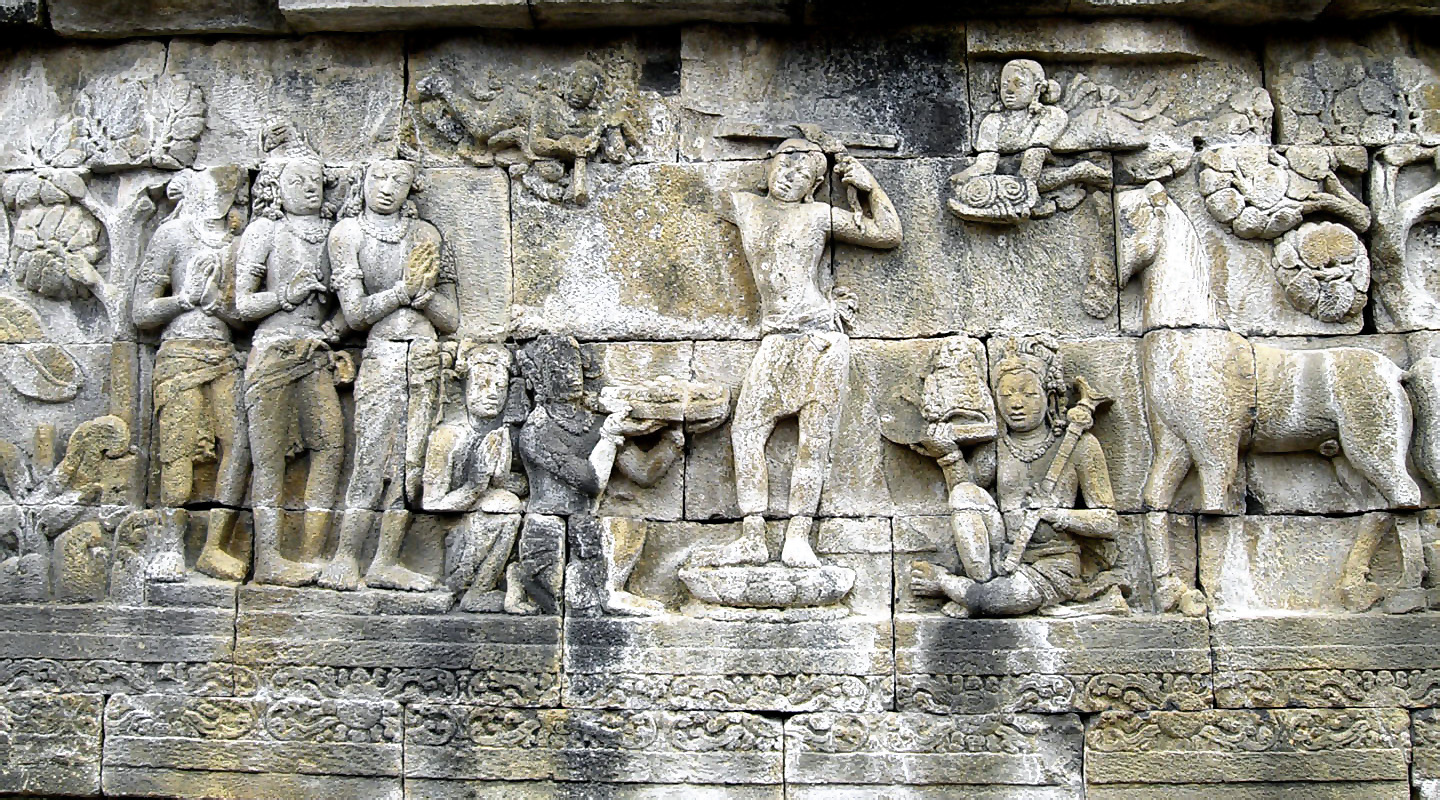
Siddharta Gautama, 8th century frieze, Borobudur

The Tahitian myths had largely disappeared by Gauguin's time (he based his own accounts on other sources without acknowledgement), as had most artefacts associated with that culture. His representation of Oviri is largely a work of imagination, informed by a collection of what he described as his "little world of friends" and which he took with him to Tahiti on his first visit. These included Odilon Redon's lithograph La Mort, photographs of subjects such as a temple frieze at Borobudur, Java, and an Egyptian fresco from an 18th dynasty tomb at Thebes. Other sources that have been suggested include an Assyrian relief of Gilgamesh clutching a lion cub now in the Louvre, and a Majapahit terracotta figure from the Djakarta museum.

Oviri's head seems based on mummified skulls of chieftains in the Marquesas Islands, whose eye sockets were traditionally encrusted with mother-of-pearl and worshiped as divine. Elements of her body may draw from Borobudur images of fecundity. Thus life and death were evoked in the same image. In a letter to Mallarmé trying to raise a public subscription to purchase the work, Morice titled the sculpture Diane Chasseresse ("Diana the Huntress"), an allusion to the ancient Greek goddess Diana of the hunt, moon and childbirth. He made the same reference in his poems on Oviri. Barbara Landy interprets the life and death theme as indicating Gauguin's need to abandon his civilised ego in a return to the natural state of the primitive savage. The work is related to the 1889 ceramic Black Venus, which shows a woman kneeling over a severed head resembling the artist.

Nancy Mowll Mathews believes the creatures in her arms and at her feet are actually foxes, animals Gauguin had used in his 1889 wood carving Be in Love, You Will Be Happy and in his 1891 Pont-Aven oil painting The Loss of Virginity. In an 1889 letter to Émile Bernard, he described the Soyez amoureuses fox as an "Indian symbol of perversity". There is a long tradition in Asian folklore of foxes having the power to transform into women (for example in Japanese Yōkai or Kitsune folklore).

Gauguin depicts the Oviri figure in at least one drawing, two watercolour transfer monotypes and two woodcuts. It is possible that the woodcuts were created in Pont-Aven in the summer of 1894; before the ceramic. The last to appear is probably the drawing in what is apparently the first issue of Gauguin's Papeete broadsheet Le Sourire "(The Smile: A Serious Newspaper)" published between August 1899 and April 1900. It was accompanied by the inscription "Et le monstre, entraînant sa créature, féconde de sa semence des flancs généreux pour engendrer Séraphitus-Séraphita" (And the monster, embracing its creation, filled her generous womb with seed and fathered Séraphitus-Séraphita). Séraphitus-Séraphita is an allusion to Honoré de Balzac's novel Séraphîta which features an androgynous hero. In this first issue of Le Sourire, he reviewed a local Maohi author's play by that dealt with incest (among other themes), and invokes 'Séraphitus-Séraphita'. The review congratulated the play's "savage author" and ended with a plea for women's liberation through the abolition of marriage. The accompanying drawing is distinctly androgynous.

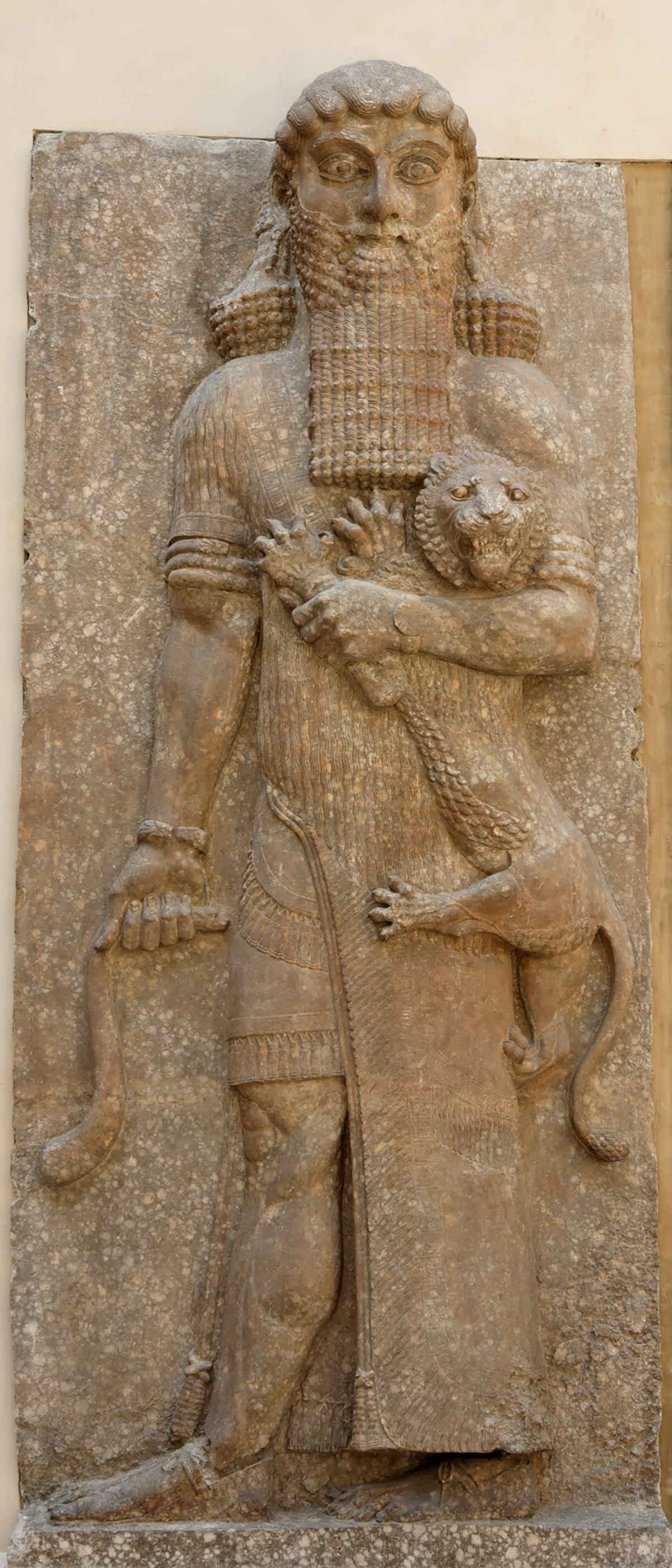
Relief from a façade in the throne room of Sargon II (Khorsabad, 713–706 BC), showing an Assyrian hero grasping a lion and a snake, Louvre

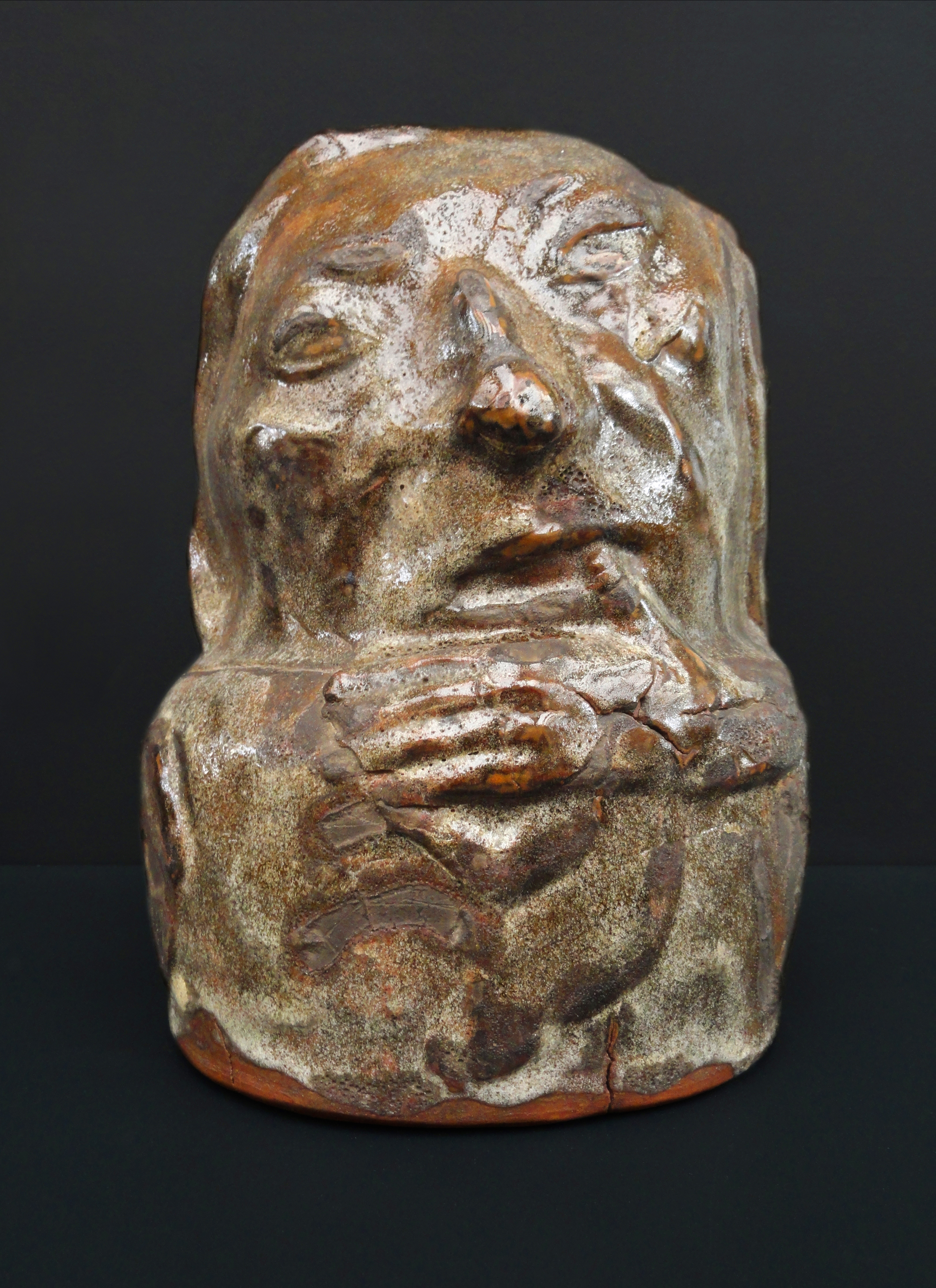
Pot Anthropomorphe, 1889, glazed stoneware, Musée d'Orsay

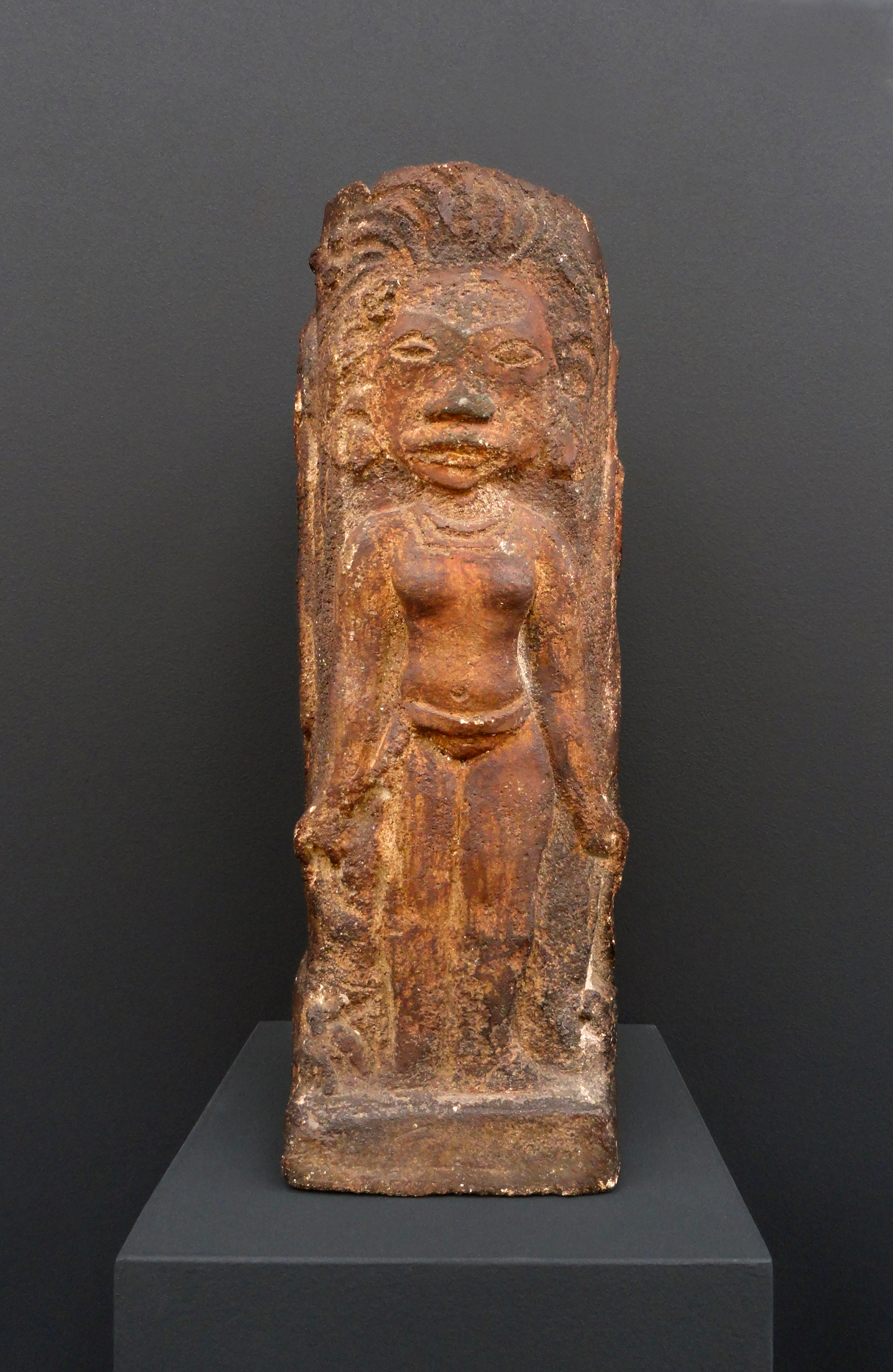
Paul Gauguin, 1893–95, Objet décoratif carré avec dieux tahitiens, terracotta, Musée d'Orsay

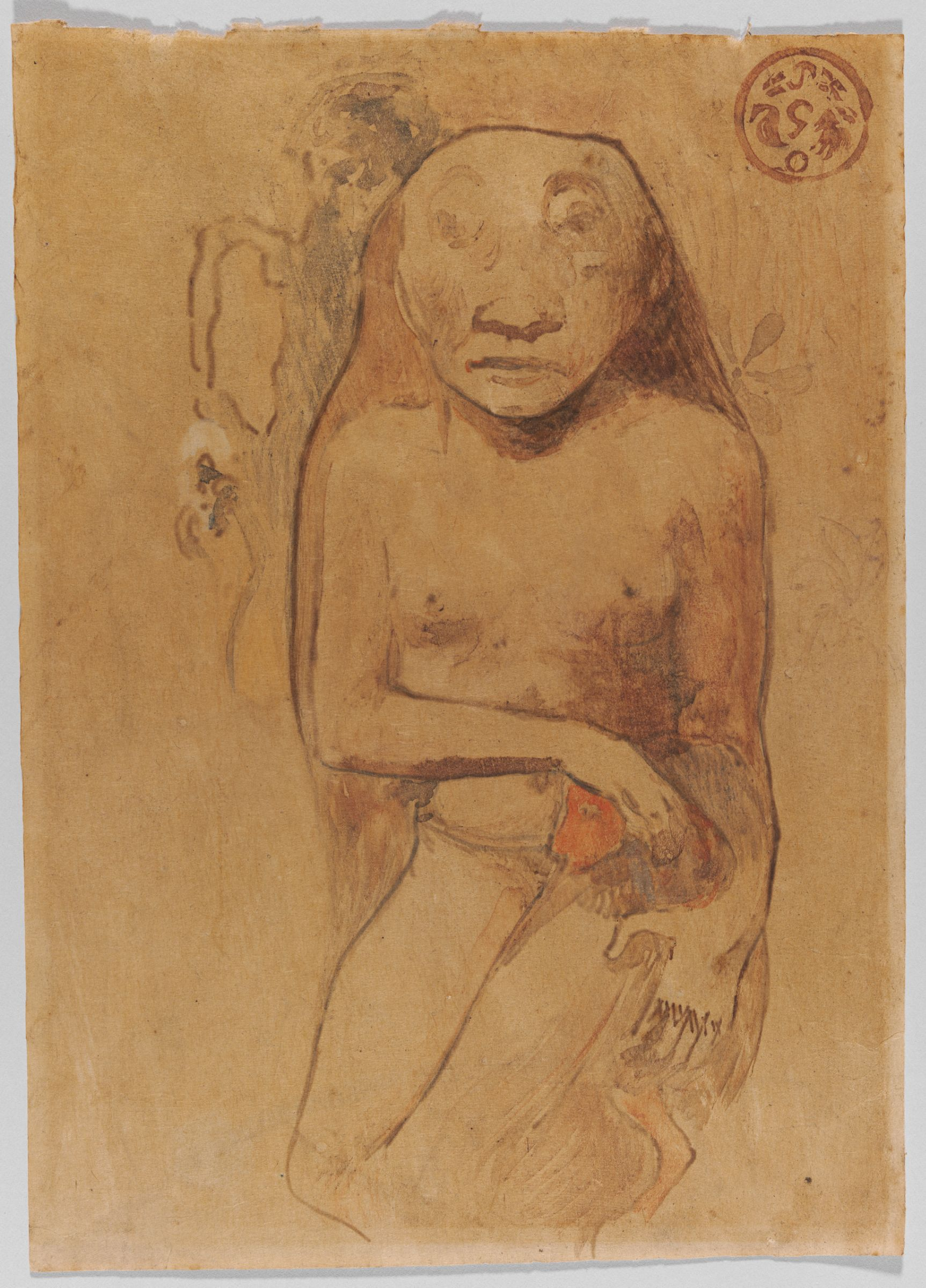
Oviri, 1894, watercolour monotype, Fogg Museum, Boston

== Interpretation ==
Art historians have put forward various theories as to the seeming multiplicity of meanings inherent in Gauguin's representation. Most obviously the figure invokes Tahitian legend and themes of death and superstition. It reflects the artist's view of female sexuality; a common motif in 19th century art was the connection between long, wild hair and evil femininity. Related is the delight Gauguin took from its alternative title "savage" and the implications of a brutal, bloodthirsty deity, which seems to refer as much to himself as the goddess.

=== Tahiti deity ===
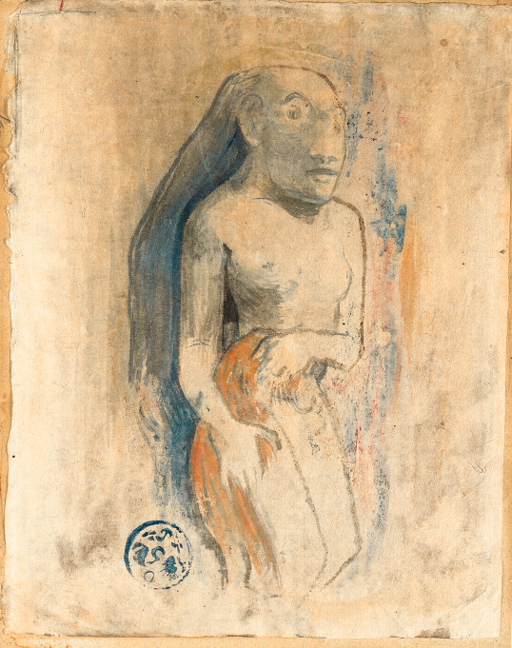
Oviri, 1894, watercolour monotype heightened with gouache on Japan paper laid down on board. Private collection

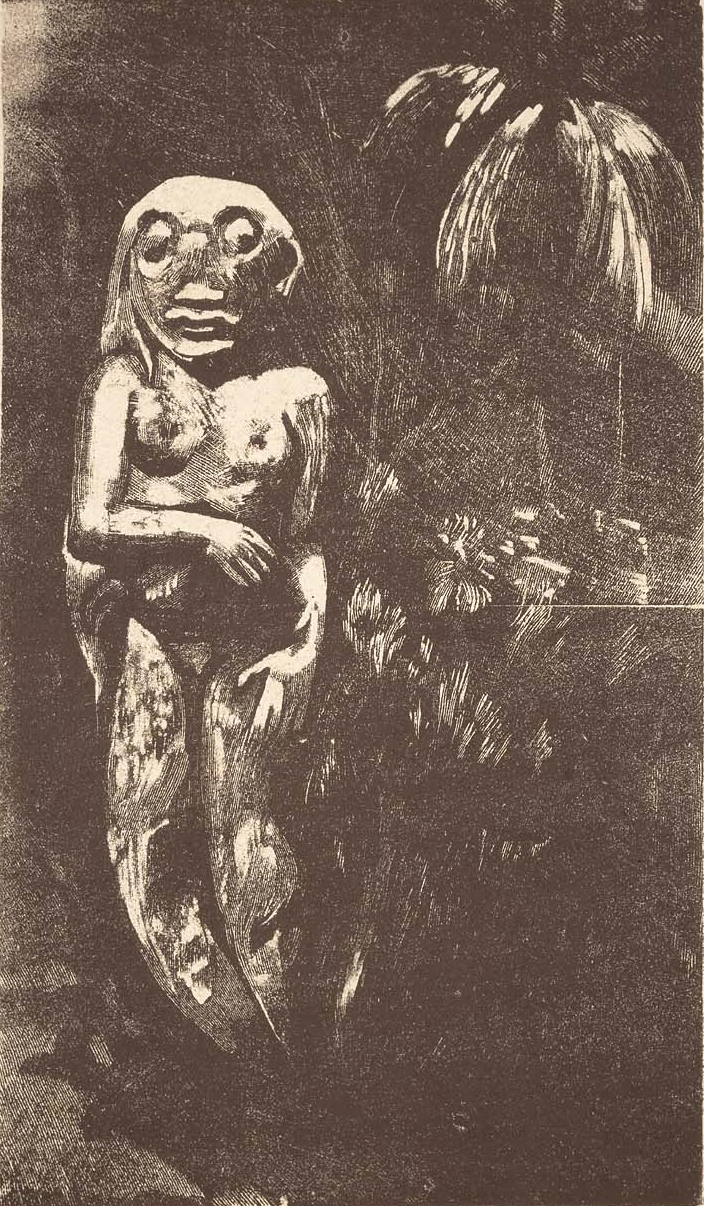
Oviri 1894, woodcut in brown ink on wove paper. Museum of Fine Arts, Boston

Gauguin's figure invokes the Polynesian goddess Hina, depicted by Morice as a Diana-like deity clutching a wolf cub, "monstrous and majestic, drunk with pride, rage and sorrow". He titled an 1894 self-portrait in plaster as Oviri. The original is lost but a number of bronze casts survive. He used double mirrors to capture his familiar Inca profile, the result reprising his Jug in the Form of a Head, Self-Portrait. This was one of the earliest occasions Gauguin applied the term Oviri to himself. "Gauguin sometimes also referred to himself as Oviri, the savage ..." writes Merete Bodelsen. The Stuttgart version of his 1892 oil painting E haere oe i hia (Where Are You Going?) depicts a woman clutching a wolf cub. Pollitt remarks that this stocky, sculptural and androgynous figure gives a first glimpse of Oviri. (Note: Taylor believes the ceramic pre-dates other representations. The 1892 painting is of dubious provenance and not known before 1923, its authenticity questioned by Richard Field, Paul Gauguin: The Paintings of the First Voyage to Tahiti. See Taylor, 346.)

Oviri was the title of a favourite Tahitian song—a melancholy tune of love and longing that mentions the subject's "savage, restless heart". It recounts the love between two women for each other, both of whom have grown silent and cold. Gauguin translated the verse in his series of romanticised journal Noa Noa (Tahitian for "fragrance", a written project he undertook to examine his Tahitian experience, which he accompanied with a series of ten woodcuts); the only one of his songs reprinted in the Tahitian newspaper La Guêpes when he became editor. (Note: Gauguin copied the song into his second 1893–95 draft in collaboration with Morice. Danielsson describes the translation as very poor and provides his own.) Danielsson believes the song echoes Gauguin's dual attachment to his Danish wife Mette and his then vahine (Tahitian for "woman") Tehaʼamana, his young native wife and the focal point of Noa Noa.

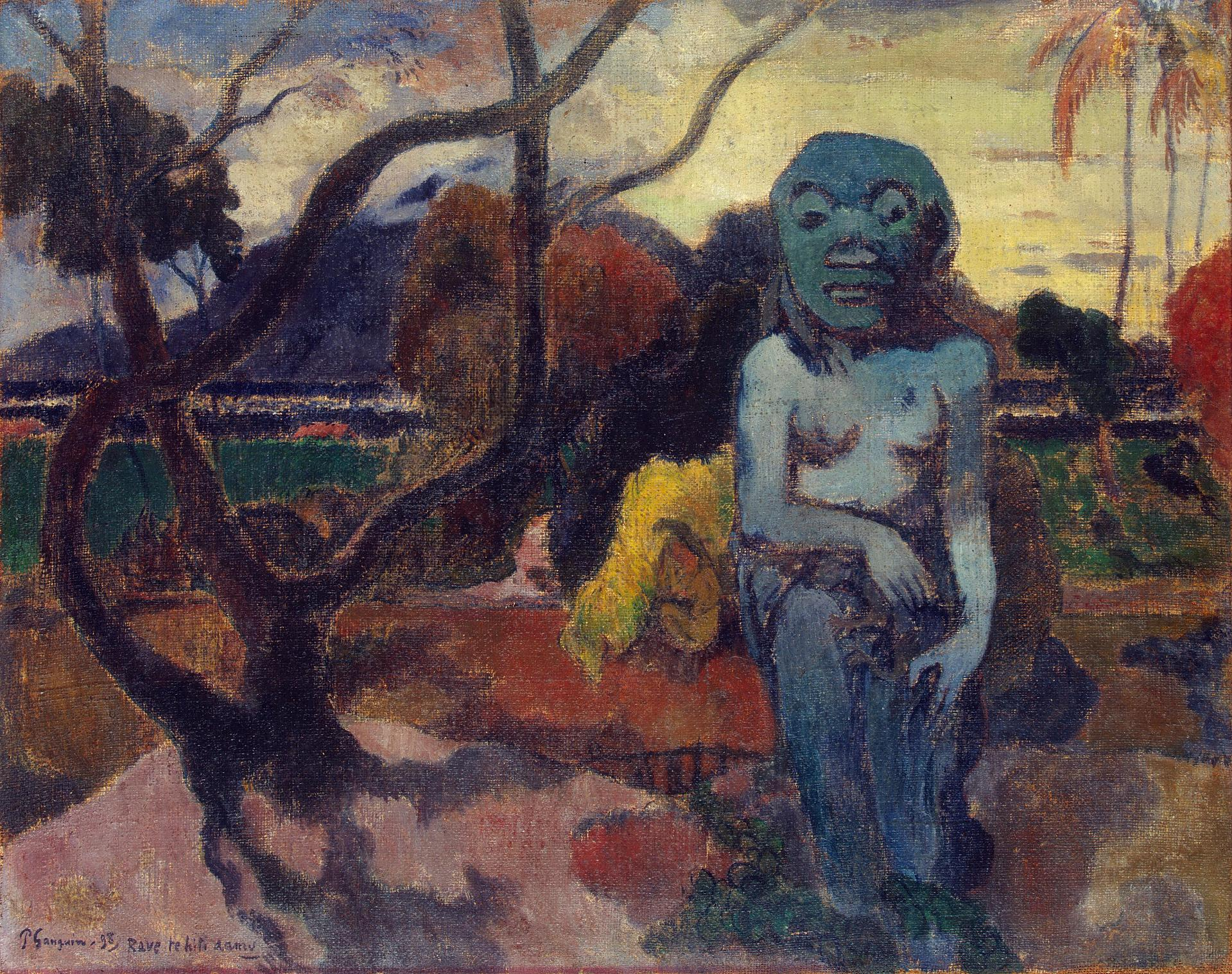
Rave te iti aamu (The Idol), 1898. Hermitage Museum

Noa Noa contains an account of a journey into the mountains with a young man whom he eventually understands as sexless, leading him to meditate on the "androgynous side of the savage" in his manuscript. Ben Pollitt notes that in Tahitian culture the craftsman/artist, neither warrior/hunter nor homemaker/carer, was conceived androgynously, an ambiguous gender position that appealed to Gauguin's subversive nature. Taylor believes Morice may have been describing Gauguin in his 1897 poem Shining Hina of the Woods as part of two long extracts from their collaboration on Noa Noa. Gray views the sculpture as representing "the expression of Gauguin's profound disillusionment and discouragement".

Noa Noa is part of Gauguin's documentation of his experiences as a colonial visitor to Tahiti in 1891–1893. He first used the term "Noa Noa" to describe the scent of Tahitian women: "A mingled perfume, half animal, half vegetable emanated from them; the perfume of their blood and of the gardenia taitensis, which they wore in their hair". On his return to Paris in 1893, Gauguin was apprehensive about exhibiting his Tahitian works. Noa Noa was to provide the context necessary for the public to comprehend the new motifs presented at his Durand-Ruel exhibition. It was not completed in time for the opening of the exhibition.

=== Self portrait ===
Gauguin asked that Oviri be placed on his grave, (Note: Letter XLVIII to Monfreid: the sculpture is not named and he says in the first place he wants it to decorate his garden: "The large ceramic figure that did not find a purchaser ... I should like to have it here for the decoration of my garden and to put on my tomb in Tahiti.") which seems to indicate that he saw the figure as his alter ego. According to Mathews, he saw the fox as changeable in its gender as he was, and thus symbolic of dangerous sexuality. A number of sources indicate that Gauguin was suffering a syphilitic rash that prevented him from travelling to Tahiti for several months. (Note: Danielsson, 182, mentions an oral source to the effect that when Gauguin returned, his vahine Tehaʼamana spent a week with him but was repulsed by the running sores covering his body) She suggests the orifice is a pars pro toto for the woman who infected him.

The anthropologist Paul van der Grijp believes Oviri was intended as an epithet to reinforce Gauguin's persona as a "civilised savage". In his final letter to Morice, the artist wrote that "You were wrong that day when you said I was wrong to say I was a savage. It's true enough: I am a savage. And civilised people sense the fact. In my work there is nothing that can surprise or disconcert, except the fact that I am a savage in spite of myself. That's also why my work is inimitable." (Note: Letter to Charles Morice, April 1903. Malingue 1949, CLXXXI: "Tu t'es trompé un jour en disant que j'avais tort de dire que je suis un sauvage. Cela est cependant vrai: je suis un sauvage. Et les civilisés le pressentent : car dans mes œuvres il n'y a rien qui surprenne, déroute, si ce n'est ce « malgré-moi-de-sauvage ». C'est pourquoi c'est inimitable.")

== Reception and influence ==
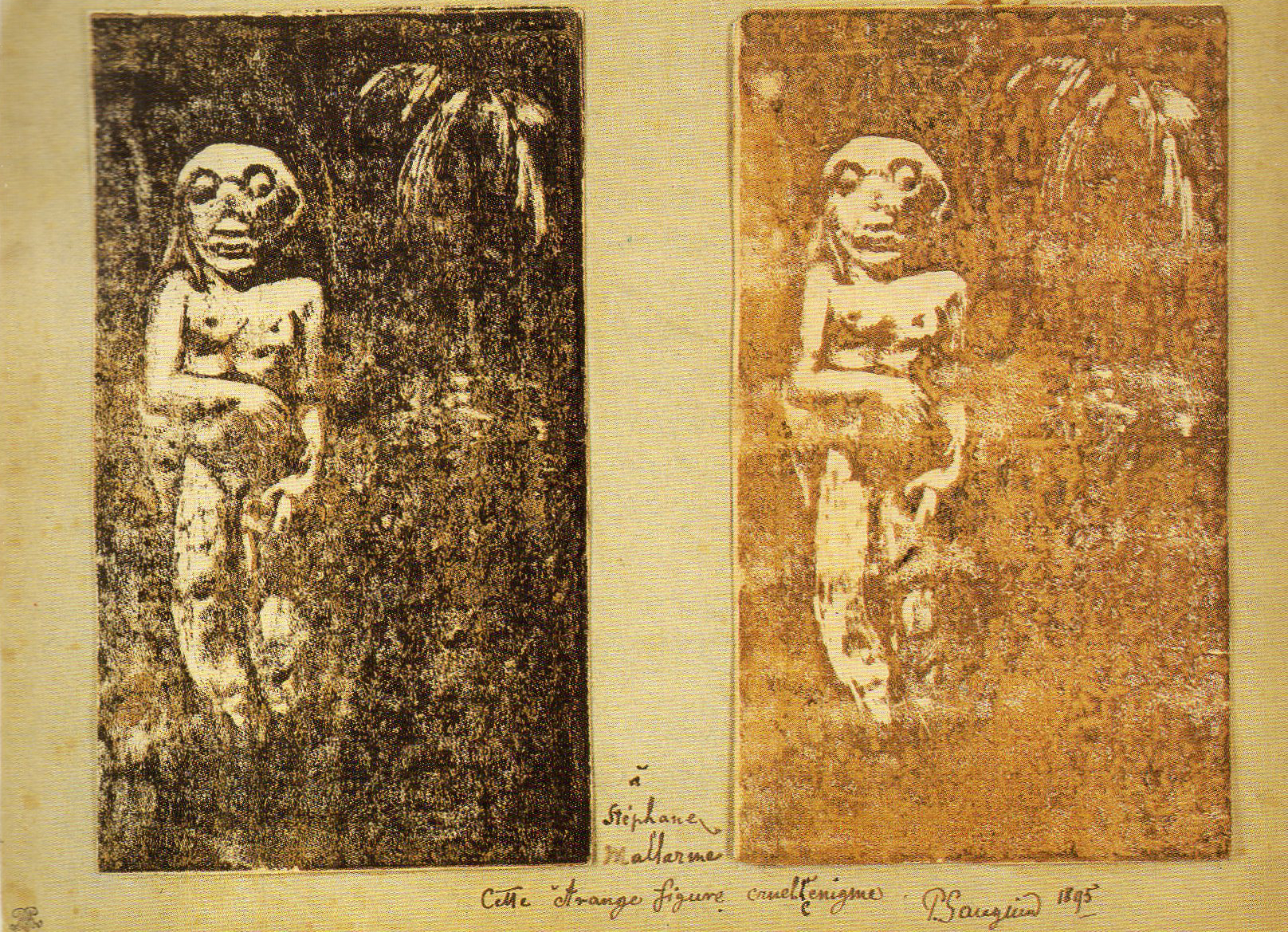
Oviri presentation mount for Stéphane Mallarmé, 1895. Art Institute of Chicago

Whether or not the sculpture was to be exhibited at the Salon de la Nationale, it was scheduled for the café proprietor Lévy at 57 rue Saint-Lazare, with whom Gauguin had concluded an agreement to represent him before his last departure for Tahiti. It failed to sell, and Charles Morice was unable to raise public money to acquire it for the nation. Gauguin had thought his only likely interested patron would be Gustave Fayet, who did eventually buy it for 1,500 francs, but in 1905, after Gauguin's death.

Gauguin was celebrated by the Parisian avant-garde after the posthumous retrospective exhibitions at the Salon d'Automne in 1903 and 1906. The power evoked by his work led directly to Les Demoiselles d'Avignon in 1907. According to David Sweetman, Picasso became an aficionado of Gauguin in 1902 when he befriended the expatriate Spanish sculptor and ceramist Paco Durrio in Paris. Durrio was a friend of Gauguin and held several of his works in an attempt to help his poverty-stricken friend in Tahiti by promoting his oeuvre in Paris.

Art historian John Richardson writes:

The 1906 exhibition of Gauguin's work left Picasso more than ever in this artist's thrall. Gauguin demonstrated the most disparate types of art—not to speak of elements from metaphysics, ethnology, symbolism, the Bible, classical myths, and much else besides—could be combined into a synthesis that was of its time yet timeless. An artist could also confound conventional notions of beauty, he demonstrated, by harnessing his demons to the dark gods (not necessarily Tahitian ones) and tapping a new source of divine energy.

Both Sweetman and Richardson point to the Gauguin Oviri as a major influence. First exhibited in the 1906 Salon d'Automne retrospective, it was probably a direct influence on Les Demoiselles. David Sweetman writes, "Gauguin's statue Oviri, which was prominently displayed in 1906, was to stimulate Picasso's interest in both sculpture and ceramics, while the woodcuts would reinforce his interest in printmaking, though it was the element of the primitive in all of them which most conditioned the direction that Picasso's art would take. This interest would culminate in the seminal Les Demoiselles d'Avignon."

In 2006, a bronze version of Oviri sold at Christie's New York for US$251,200.

== Recent exhibitions ==
- Tokyo, Seibu Department Store; Kyoto, Musée National d'Art Moderne, and Fukuoka, Centre Culturel, Gauguin, August 1969, no. 110
- Munich, Haus der Kunst, Weltkulturen und Moderne Kunst, XX Olympics, July–August 1972, no. 1726
- The Colour of sculpture 1840–1910, Henry Moore Institute, Leeds, 1996
- Gauguin Tahiti, Paris, 2003
- Gauguin Tahiti, Museum of Fine Arts, Boston, 2004
- Chefs-d'oeuvre du musée d'Orsay pour le 150e anniversaire de la galerie Tretyakov, Tretyakov Gallery, Moscow, 2006
- Cézanne to Picasso, Ambroise Vollard, Patron of the Avant-Garde, Metropolitan Museum of Art, New York, 2006
- Cézanne to Picasso, Ambroise Vollard, Patron of the Avant-Garde, Art Institute of Chicago, 2007
- Gauguin, Maker of Myth. Tate Modern, London, 2010
- Gauguin, Maker of Myth, National Gallery of Art, Washington D.C., 2011
- Gauguin Polynesia, Ny Carlsberg Glyptotek, Copenhagen, 2011
- Gauguin Polynesia, Seattle Art Museum, Seattle, 2012
- Gauguin, Metamorphosis; MoMA, NYC, 2014
- Paul Gauguin, Fondation Beyeler, Riehen, 2015

== Sources ==
=== Bibliography ===
- Barkan, Elazar; Bush, Ronald. Prehistories of the Future: The Primitivist Project and the Culture of Modernism. Stanford, CA: Stanford University Press, 1996. ISBN 978-0-8047-2486-9
- Brooks, Van Wyck. Paul Gauguin's Intimate Journals. New York, NY: Boni and Liveright, 1921
- Brettell, Richard; Zegers, Peter. The Art of Paul Gauguin. Washington, D.C.: National Gallery of Art, 1988. ISBN 978-0-8212-1723-8
- Cachin, Françoise. Gauguin. Paris: Flammarion, 1990. ISBN 978-2-08-030430-8
- Campbell, Gordon. The Grove Encyclopedia of Decorative Arts, Volume 1. Oxford: Oxford University Press, 1996. ISBN 978-0-397-58773-5
- Castets, H. Gauguin, Revue universelle, III:xcvi, 15 October 1903, p. 536
- Chipp, Herschel Browning. In: Selz, Peter (ed). Theories of Modern Art. Oakland, CA: University of California Press, 1984. ISBN 978-0-520-05256-7
- Danielsson, Bengt. Gauguin in the South Seas. New York, NY: Doubleday and Company, 1965
- Eisenman, Stephen. Gauguin's Skirt. London: Thames and Hudson, 1999. ISBN 978-0-500-28038-6
- Frèches-Thory, Claire; Zegers, Peter. The Art of Paul Gauguin. Washington, D.C.: National Gallery of Art, 1988. ISBN 0-8212-1723-2
- Gedo, John. "The Inner World of Paul Gauguin". The Annual of Psychoanalysis, v. 22. London: Routledge, 1994. ISBN 978-0-88163-135-7
- Gray, Christopher. Sculpture and Ceramics of Paul Gauguin. Baltimore, MD: Johns Hopkins Press, no. 113, 1963
- Ives, Colta. The Great Wave: The Influence of Japanese Woodcuts on French Prints. New York: Bulfinch Press, 1981. ISBN 978-0-87099-228-5
- Landy, Barbara. "The Meaning of Gauguin's 'Oviri' Ceramic". Burlington Magazine, Volume 109, No. 769, April 1967
- Malingue, Maurice. Paul Gauguin: Letters to his Wife and Friends. Cleveland, OH: MFA Publications, 1949. ISBN 978-0-87846-665-8
- Mathews, Nancy Mowll. Paul Gauguin, an Erotic Life. New Haven, CT: Yale University Press, 2001. ISBN 978-0-300-09109-0
- Maurer, Naomi. The Pursuit of Spiritual Wisdom. Madison, NJ: Fairleigh Dickinson University Press, 1998. ISBN 978-0-8386-3749-4
- Morice, Charles. Noa Noa: The Tahiti Journal of Paul Gauguin. San Francisco, CA: Chronicle, 1901. ISBN 978-0-8118-0366-3
- Morice, Charles. Paul Gauguin, Paris, 1919. 158–59
- Nicole, Robert. The Word, the Pen, and the Pistol: Literature and Power in Tahiti. New York: State University of New York Press, 2000. ISBN 978-0-7914-4740-6
- Pielkovo, Ruth. The letters of Paul Gauguin to Georges Daniel de Monfreid. Madison, WI: University of Wisconsin, 1922
- Richardson, John A. A Life Of Picasso, The Cubist Rebel 1907–1916. New York: Alfred A. Knopf, 1991. ISBN 978-0-307-26665-1
- Schackelford, George. Gauguin, Tahiti. Boston, MA: Museum of Fine Arts, 2004. ISBN 978-0-87846-666-5
- Solomon-Godeau, Abigail. Going Native, Paul Gauguin and the Invention of the Primitivist Modernist. The Expanding Discourse: Feminism and Art History. Boulder, CO: WestView, 1992
- Sugana, G.M. L'opera completa di Gauguin, p. 111, no. 394–1, Milan, 1972
- Sweetman, David. Paul Gauguin: A life. New York: Simon & Schuster, 1995. ISBN 978-0-684-80941-0
- Szech, Anna. Paul Gauguin. Stuttgart: Hatje Cantz, 2015. ISBN 978-3-7757-3959-7
- Taylor, Sue. "Oviri: Gauguin's Savage Woman". Journal of Art History, Volume 62, Issue 3/4, 1993
- Thomson, Belinda. Gauguin. London: Thames and Hudson, 1987. ISBN 978-0-500-20220-3
- van der Grijp, Paul. An Anthropology of the Yearning for Authenticity. Münster: Lit Verlag, 2009. ISBN 978-3-8258-1667-4
- Vollard, A. Souvenirs d'un marchand de tableaux, Paris, 1937, p. 197
- Wadley, N. ed., Noa Noa, Gauguin's Tahiti, p. 124, pl. 79, London, 1985
