= Still Life with Exotic Birds =

Painting by Paul Gauguin

- Still Life with Parrots
- Artist: Paul Gauguin
- Year: 1902
- Medium: oil on canvas
- Dimensions: 62 cm × 76 cm (24 in × 30 in)
- Location: Pushkin Museum of Fine Arts, Moscow

Still Life with Exotic Birds also known as Still Life with Parrots is an oil on canvas painting by Paul Gauguin, produced in Atuona on Hiva-Oa in the Marquesas Islands, in 1902. It is held in the Pushkin Museum, in Moscow. It is signed "Paul Gauguin 1902" at bottom left, with the inscription "Oiseaux morts" (dead birds) on the back of the stretcher.

Marina Alexandrovna Bessonova argues that the tablecloth covers a travelling trunk rather than a table, but the table leg is clearly visible on the right. The terracotta idol shown was made by Gauguin himself - some art historians believe it is the Polynesian moon goddess Hina (often found in other Gauguin works produced on Tahiti), but Bengt Danielsson claims it is "a kind of Buddha" rather than Tahitian or Polynesian.

Just after producing the work Gauguin sent it to his friend George-Daniel de Monfreid in France, who sold it to Gustave Fayet from Paris. It was known as Dead Birds in Fayet's collection, but this was changed to the more neutral Exotic Birds (Parrots) in the posthumous retrospective of Gauguin's work at the 1906 Autumn Salon in Paris. In 1910 Fayet sold the painting via the Galerie Druet to the Moscow industrialist Ivan Morozov for 27,000 francs. His collection was seized by the state after the October Revolution, being placed in the State Museum of Modern Western Art from 1923 to 1948 and then at its present home.
