= The King's Wife (painting) =

Painting by Paul Gauguin

- Te Arii Vahine (Tahitian)
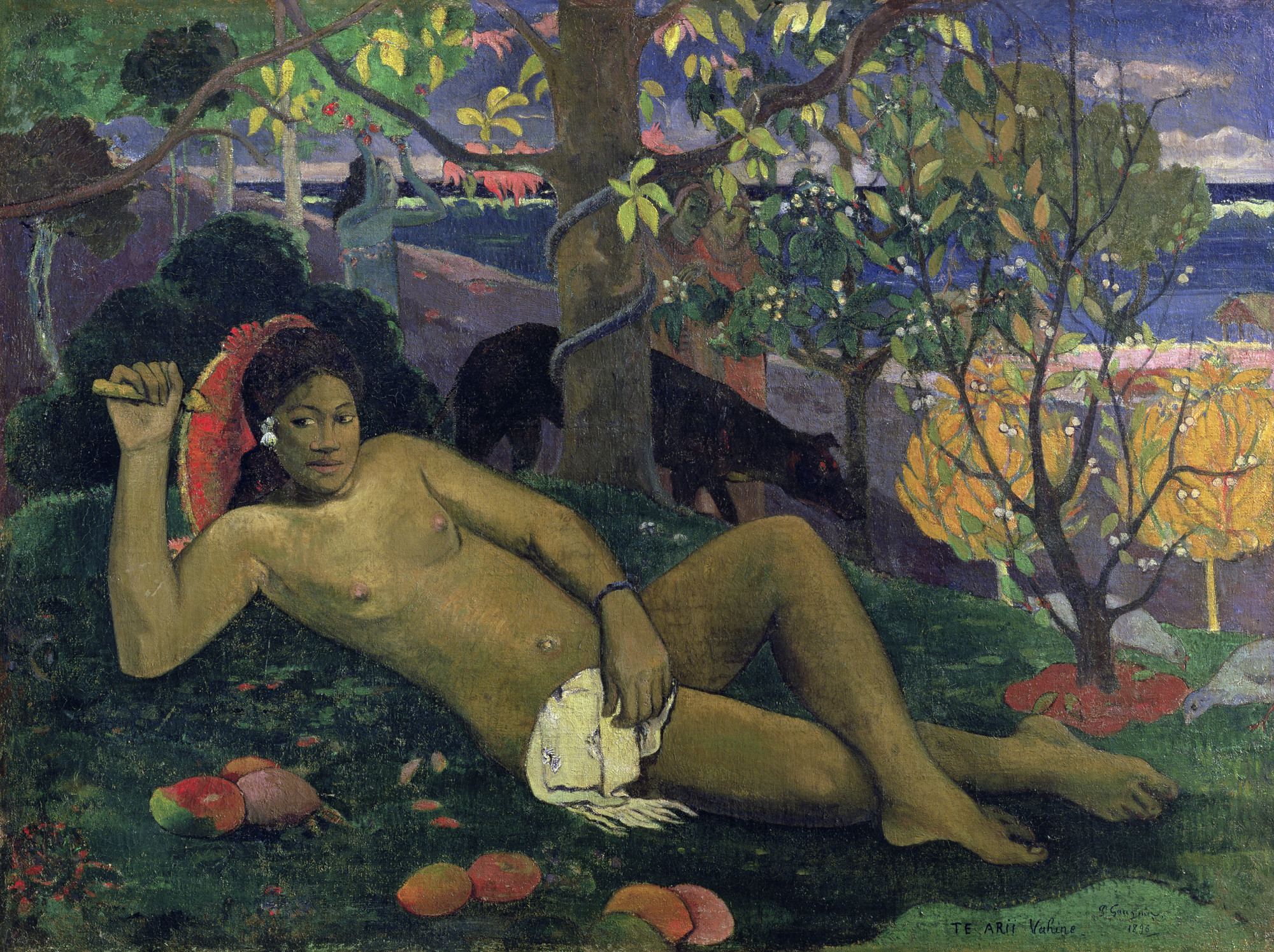
- Artist: Paul Gauguin
- Year: April 1896
- Medium: oil on canvas
- Dimensions: 97 cm × 130 cm (38 in × 51 in)
- Location: Pushkin Museum, Moscow

The King's Wife or The Queen is an early 1896 oil on canvas painting by Paul Gauguin, now in the Pushkin Museum in Moscow. It is also known as Woman with Mango Fruits, Woman under a Mango Tree or Te arii vahine (the Tahitian title painted at bottom right).

It was produced on Tahiti, with Gauguin writing to his friend Daniel Monfreud in April 1896 “I have just finished a painting …, which I consider much more successful than the previous one: a naked queen lies on a green carpet, a servant picks fruits, two old men near a larger tree are discussing the tree of knowledge; in the depths of the sea coast. <...> It seems to me that in terms of colour I have never created a single thing with such a strong solemn sonority. The trees are in bloom, the dog is guarding, on the right, two doves are cooing. But what is the point of sending this painting when there are already so many others that are not for sale and cause a howl? This will cause an even louder howl.”

Monfreud kept the painting until it was bought in August 1903 for 1,100 francs by Gustave Fayet. The news of Gauguin's death in April 1903 had not yet reached Monfreud, so the latter sent him a letter informing him that the painting had sold, but the letter was returned unopened and marked "deceased". Fayet, Gauguin and Monfreud all considered the painting one of the artist's best, heavily influenced by Édouard Manet's Olympia, of which Gauguin made a copy (now in a private collection) and of which he took a reproduction to Tahiti.
