= Jug in the Form of a Head, Self-Portrait =

Sculpture by Paul Gauguin

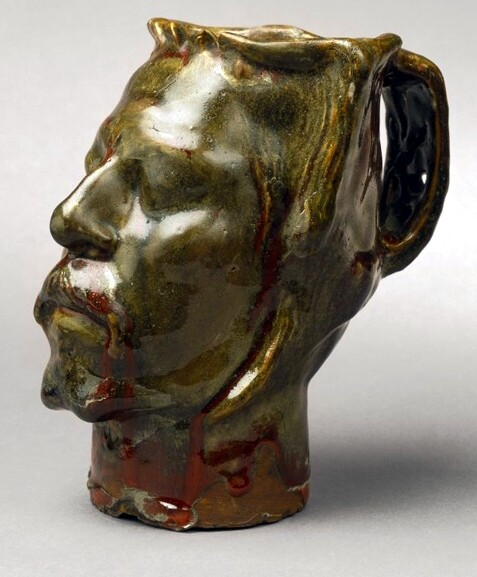
Jug in the Form of a Head, Self-portrait, Gauguin, 1889. Kunstindustrimuseet, Copenhagen.

Jug in the form of a Head, Self-portrait (usually referred to as the Jug Self-portrait) was produced in glazed stoneware early in 1889 by the French Post-Impressionist artist Paul Gauguin. This self-portrayal is especially stark and brutal, and was created in the aftermath of two traumatic events in the artist's life. In December 1888 Gauguin was visiting Vincent van Gogh in Arles when Van Gogh cut off his left ear (or part of it, accounts vary) before leaving it at a brothel frequented by them both. A few days later in Paris, Gauguin witnessed the beheading of the notorious murderer Prado. Gauguin shows his severed head, dripping with rivulets of blood, his ear cut off, his eyes closed as if in denial.

Gauguin portrays himself with closed eyes and a severed ear. Glaze is used to suggest blood which runs down the side of his face to congeal at his neck. As with many of his self-portraits the object is infused with self-pity. The head resembles a death mask, and the way it is modelled strongly suggests that it has been decapitated, reminiscent of Prado. The portrait evokes Van Gogh in a number of ways, most obviously with the removed ear and its dominant red colouring which gives it, according to writer Naomi Margolis Maurer, "a strong fictitious resemblance to the suffering van Gogh".

The stoneware contains subtle green, grey and olive tones that are often not apparent in reproduction, while its brutal physicality is in part achieved by its three-dimensionality. It has been noted by a number of art critics that photographic reproductions of the object largely fail to convey the impact it makes when viewed firsthand. In 1989 the critic Laurel Gasque wrote, "This macabre image, fired at a very high temperature literally and figuratively, fuses life, myth, and history into an unforgettable emblem of a ravaged man."

== Background ==
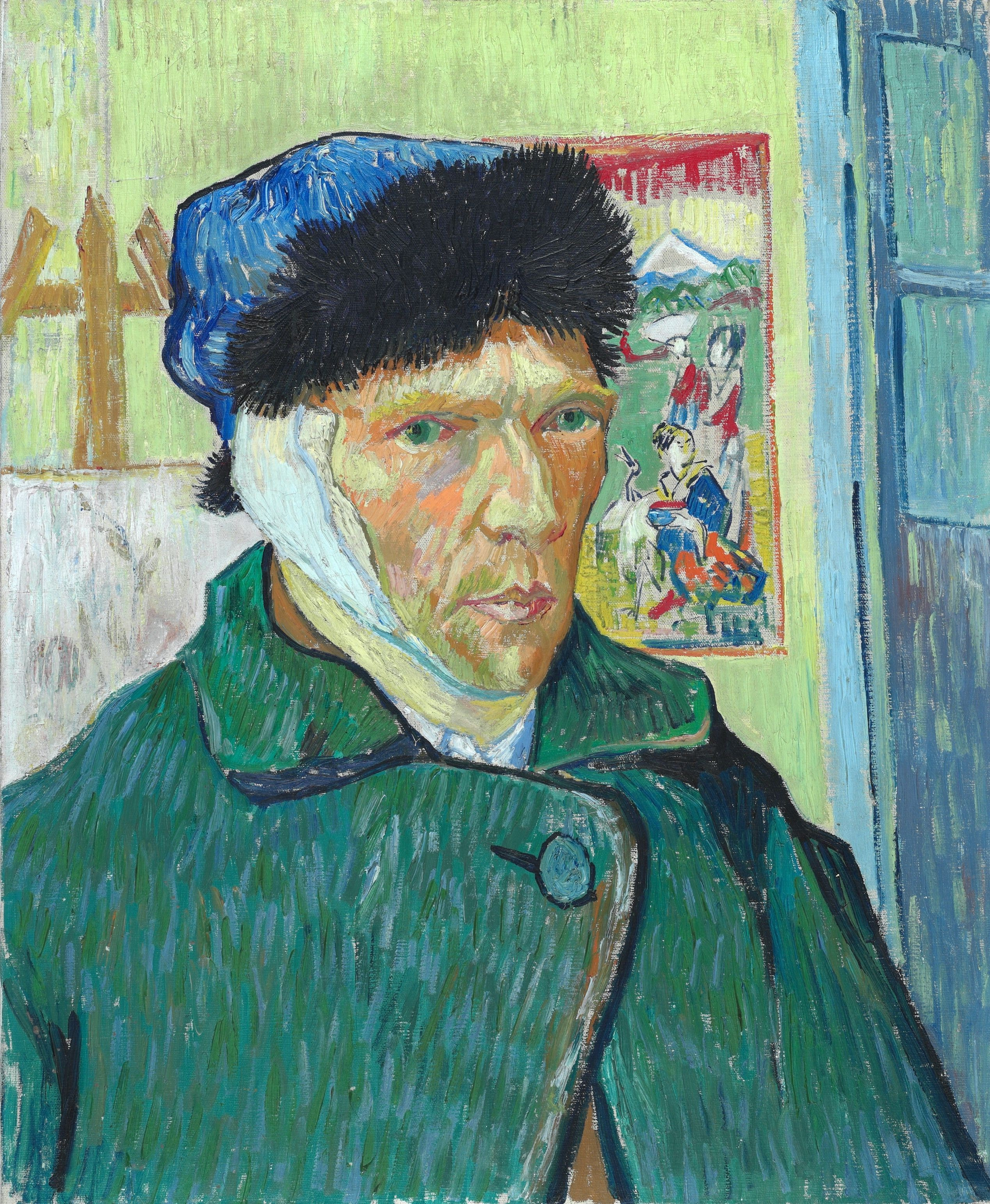
van Gogh, Self-portrait with bandaged ear, 1889, Courtauld Institution

A number of events in Gauguin's life led to the object's creation. During November and December of the previous year, he lived with van Gogh in Arles. The objective had been to found an artists' commune. Van Gogh greatly admired Gauguin, and desperately wanted to be treated as his equal. But Gauguin was arrogant and domineering, a fact that often frustrated the Dutchman. Relations between the two deteriorated and eventually Gauguin, alarmed by Van Gogh's drunkenness and temperament, told him he was leaving. Later that day, on a possibly self-serving account supplied by Gauguin fifteen years later, Van Gogh confronted Gauguin with the same razor blade he used hours later to mutilate himself, cutting off his left ear (or part of it), an injury sufficiently serious to induce arterial bleeding. Accounts differ as to what happened next, not least because van Gogh himself had no subsequent recollection of the events, but it is certain that van Gogh, after staunching the bleeding, bandaged his injury and left the severed ear at a maison de tolérance on Rue du Bout d'Aeles that van Gogh and Gauguin frequented. Van Gogh at this time was extolling the virtue of sexual continence in the pursuit of Art (he was, in any case, impotent by then), but nevertheless used prostitutes for "hygienic reasons". The story that he left the ear with a prostitute called Rachel asking her to "guard it like a treasure" that immediately gained currency, appears to originate from a local news report of the time. Gauguin's own account was that he left it with the bouncer with the message "Remember me" (the implication being that it was meant for Gauguin), before staggering back to the house he shared with Gauguin. Gauguin was amongst the first to find the Dutch artist the morning after, lying unconscious with his head covered in blood.

According to art critic Martin Gayford, prostitutes were to van Gogh Sisters of Mercy, providing "a little taste of paradise at 2 francs a time", and representing his single emotional and sensuous point of contact with other people. He was around this time reading about Christ's agony in the garden of Gethsemane, where Jesus prayed with his disciples the night before his crucifixion. The story struck a deep chord, in particular, the words "If thou be willing, remove this cup from me: nevertheless not my will, but thine, be done". He and Gauguin had been discussing a recent series of murders of prostitutes (those of Prado and Jack the Ripper). He had recently read Émile Zola's novel "The Sin of Father Mouret", in which a character "as Father Mournet was finishing his prayers...calmly pulled a knife from his pocket, opened it, and chopped off the friar's ears."

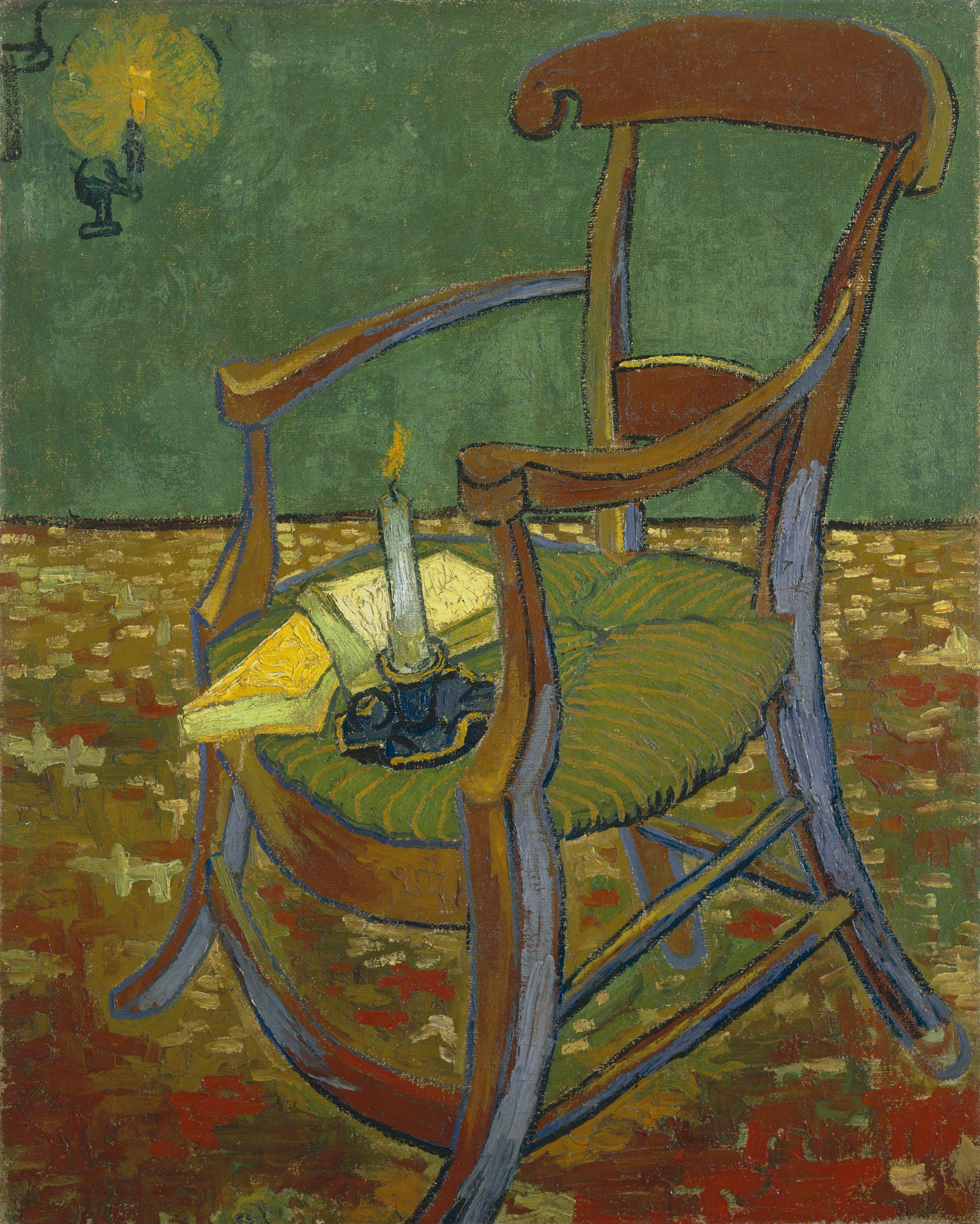
Vincent van Gogh, Paul Gauguin's Armchair, 1888

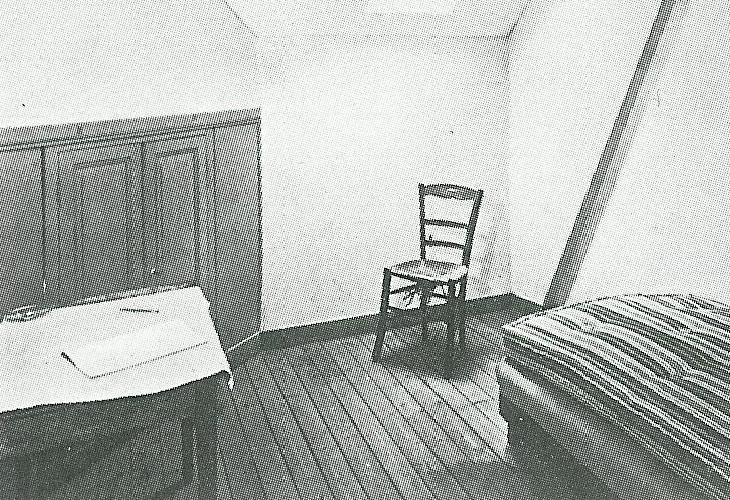
Photograph of the empty chair in van Gogh's room at the Auberge Ravoux in Auvers.

There is no conclusive evidence that the unpredictable Gauguin attacked his equally temperamental friend that day.

When Vincent's brother Theo arrived at the Arles hospital a few days later—after being informed of the event by Gauguin—he spoke of Vincent's irrationality, high fever and apparent "madness" in the days before the mutilation. From his hospital bed, Van Gogh asked for Gauguin continually over the next number of days, but the Frenchman stayed away. He had told one of the policemen attending the case when van Gogh was discovered unconscious, "Be kind enough, Monsieur, to awaken this man with great care, and if he asks for me, tell him I have left for Paris; the sight of me might prove fatal for him." From accounts related by Gauguin to friends on his arrival back in Paris a few days later, it has been suggested that he also associated the amputation with Gethsemane.

On December 28, two days after his return to Paris, Gauguin went to the dawn execution of the criminal Prado. Van Gogh and Gauguin had talked about Prado's high-profile trial. Prado had murdered a prostitute and Gauguin thought his trial unjust, a view he shared with Friedrich Nietzsche who refers to him in his last "madness letter". Both Prado and the equally infamous murderer Pranzini were at one time patrons at the Parisian café Le Tambourin where Van Gogh had exhibited Japanese prints. The execution left a deep mark on the artist and soured the artist's view of humanity. According to Gauguin's account, the execution was botched; the first strike of the guillotine's blade missed Prado's neck and carved off a portion of his face. The man rose from the headboard in agony and shock and had to be forced back into position before the second attempt to remove his head. However contemporary news reports of the execution make no mention of this.

Gauguin's attendance at the execution was a result of the deep shock left by Van Gogh's self-mutilation. Writer Jerome Winer suggests that Gauguin may have felt guilty over his treatment of Van Gogh to identify with Prado. According to Bradley Collins, "There is no question that Gauguin would have strongly associated Vincent with the execution". Collins continues, "If Gauguin had been terrified by the sight of the near-dead Vincent curled up in his bloody sheets, he may have had the counterphobic desire to reassure himself of his courage by taking an unflinching look at Prado's execution. He may also have wanted to glory in his own innocence and another's guilt."

== Iconography ==
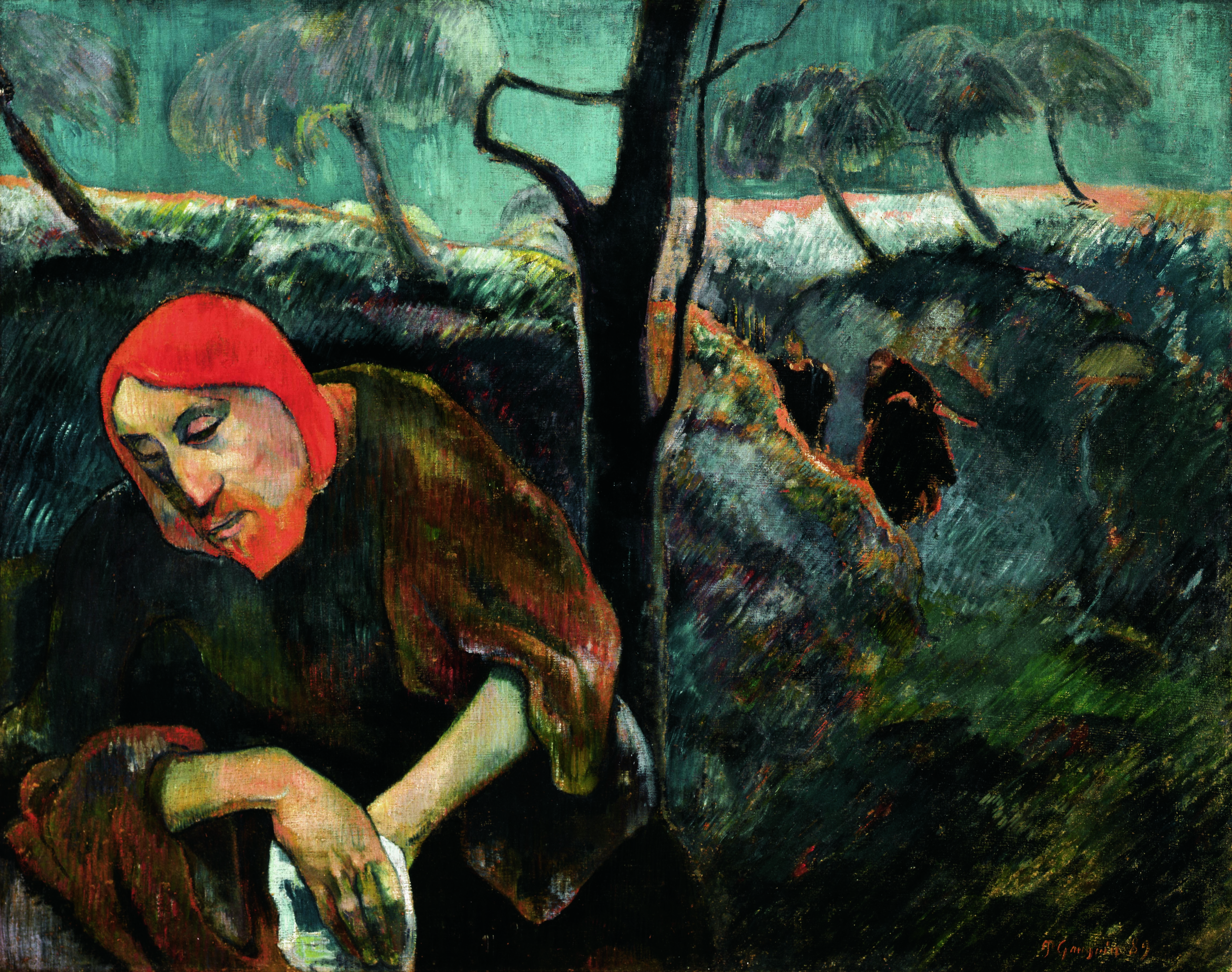
Christ in the Garden of Olives, Gauguin, 1889. Note the red hair of the Christ / Gauguin self-portrait hybrid, the colour of which has been described as "supernaturally red", and as with the jug object directly evokes van Gogh.

The work is informed by Romantic and Symbolist iconography, as well as motifs from Christian and classical sources; it evokes Christ, John the Baptist and Orpheus, all of whom were martyred for their passion and beliefs. During this period, Gauguin often portrayed himself in a manner similar to representations of Christ, in an attempt to evoke martyrdom. Gauguin was disillusioned with the materialism he saw around him and, at the time, felt alienated by the art-buying public and from members of the art scene who reacted against his domineering and self-aggrandising personality. Younger artists who had been his disciples rebelled and he was sidelined. Of another similar self-portrait, Christ in the Garden of Olives, Gauguin wrote

There I have painted my own self portrait ... but it also represents the crushing of an ideal, and a pain that is both divine and human, Jesus is totally abandoned; his disciples are leaving him, in a setting as sad as his soul.

The technique used to create the object was borrowed in part from the Far East, especially in the use of dripped paint on glazed stoneware which was influenced by Japanese craftsmen of the Takatori region. The idea of merging the form of a head and a jug was taken from Peruvian pottery, likely from pieces his mother had collected when he was a child.

== Sources ==
- Collins, Bradley. Van Gogh and Gauguin: Electric Arguments and Utopian Dreams. Boulder, CO: Westview Press, 2001. ISBN 0-8133-3595-7
- Cachin, Francoise. Gauguin. Flammarion, 1990. ISBN 2-08-030430-5
- Druick, Douglas; Druick, Peter; Salvesen, Britt; Lister; Kristin. Van Gogh and Gauguin: the studio of the south. Art Institute of Chicago with Rijksmuseum Vincent van Gogh, 2001. ISBN 0-500-51054-7
- Galbally, Ann. A Remarkable Friendship: Vincent van Gogh and John Peter Russell. Miegunyah Press, 2008. ISBN 0-522-85376-5
- Gasque, Laurel. "Gauguin: Sight and Sound". ThirdWay, Volume 12, No 4, April 1989.
- Gayford, Martin. The Yellow House: Van Gogh, Gauguin, and Nine Turbulent Weeks in Provence. New York: Mariner Books, 2008. ISBN 0-618-99058-5
- Margolis Maurer, Naomi. The Pursuit of Spiritual Wisdom: Thought and Art of Vincent van Gogh and Paul Gauguin. Madison, NJ: Fairleigh Dickinson University Press, 1998. ISBN 0-8386-3749-3
- Naifeh, Steven; Smith, Gregory White. Van Gogh: The Life. Profile Books, 2011. ISBN 978-1-84668-010-6
- Winer, Jerome. The Annual of Psychoanalysis, Volume 22 New York: Routledge, 1995. ISBN 0-88163-135-3
