= Le Sourire =

French magazine

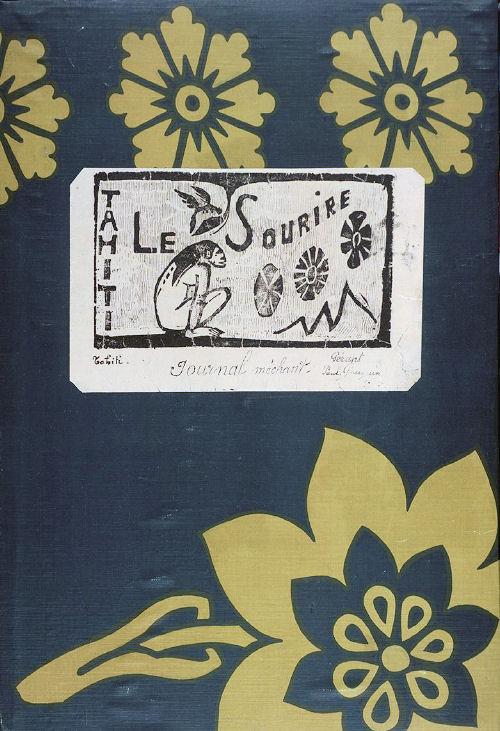
- Cover of Le Sourire dedicated to George-Daniel de Monfreid, c. 1901. From the collections of the Kon-Tiki Museum
- Founder: Paul Gauguin
- First issue: August 1899; 126 years ago
- Final issue Number: April 1900; 126 years ago 9
- Country: French Third Republic

Le Sourire was a French monthly magazine that was published by the French artist Paul Gauguin between August 1899 and April 1900.

== Original Version ==
Le Sourire was a monthly periodical published by the French artist Paul Gauguin. The editions contained satirical copy, illustrated by his pen and screen drawings, with one of his woodcuts used for the header. It was in part inspired by the more successful Parisian periodical Le Rire, illustrated by artists such as Toulouse-Lautrec.

A total of nine editions were printed during August 1899 and April 1900, between his stays in Tahiti and the Marquesas Islands. It is not known how many copies of each edition were printed, probably not more than 30. Due to a limited budget, and the fact that they were hand printed, the quality of the reproductions was often poor and blotchy, he used cheap glue to bind the leaves to the paper. However, they are admired by art critics and historians today.

== Second Version ==
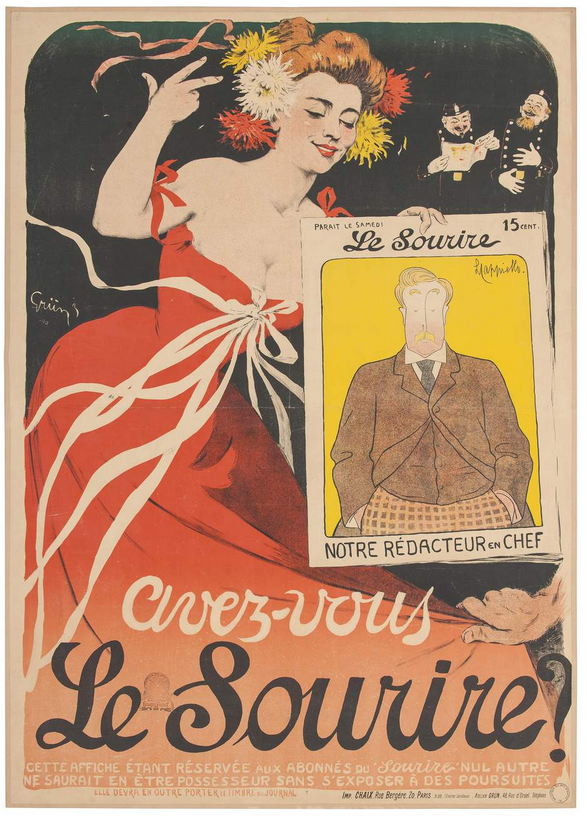
1900 Lithographed advertising poster, Do you have the Smile?,: a smiling woman wants to censor with imaginary scissors the magazine which depicts editor Alphonse Allais; bottom right, one hand grabs the woman's dress while two gendarmes laugh in a corner.

A second version of Le Sourire began on 25 August 1899 under the operation of Maurice Mery, who had experience with art review journals and newspapers. This weekly version came out on Saturdays under the editorship of Alphonse Allais. Le Sourire suspended publishing with the advent of the First World War, but resumed on 14 April 1917 with Rudolphe Bringer at the helm.

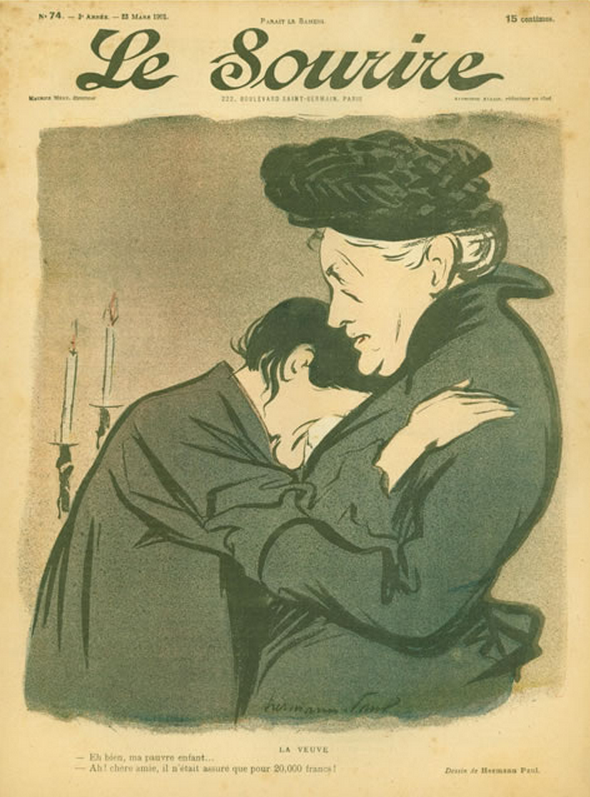
Le Sourire 23 March 1901 La veuve : - Eh bien, ma pauvre enfant... : - Ah ! chère amie, il n'était assuré que pour 20.000 francs!

The revived magazine was known as Le Sourire de France and had more risqué content, frequently featuring covers with pin-up style art and jokes. In 1922 Paul Briquet became the director and held the position until 1930. The magazine itself continued with weekly publication until 30 September 1939, when it became bi-weekly. However, this ended in May 1940 with the fall of France.

== Gallery ==
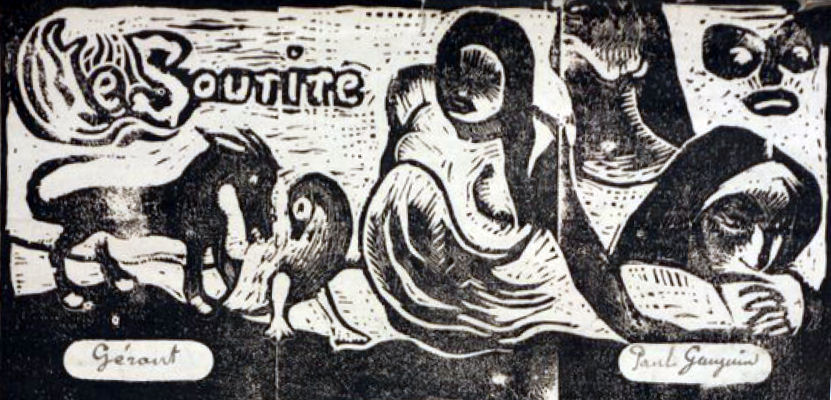
Three People, a Mask, a Fox and a Bird

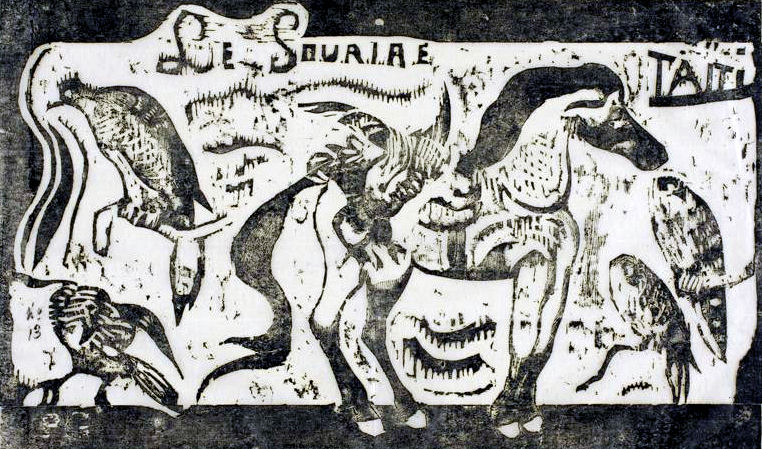
A Horse and Birds

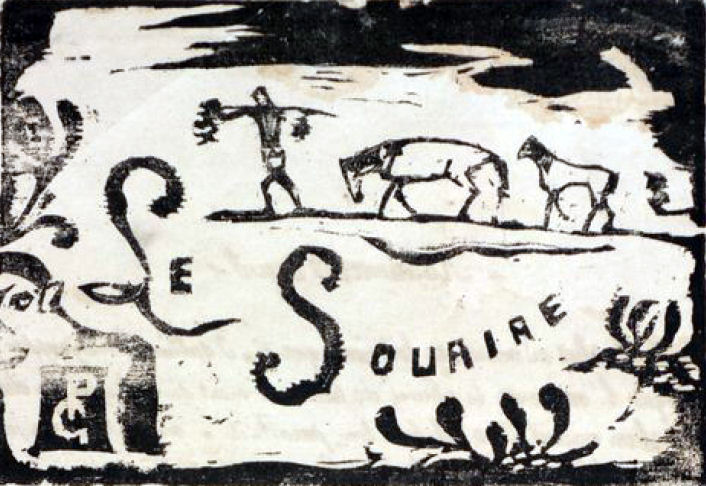
Man Carrying Bananas Followed by Two Horses

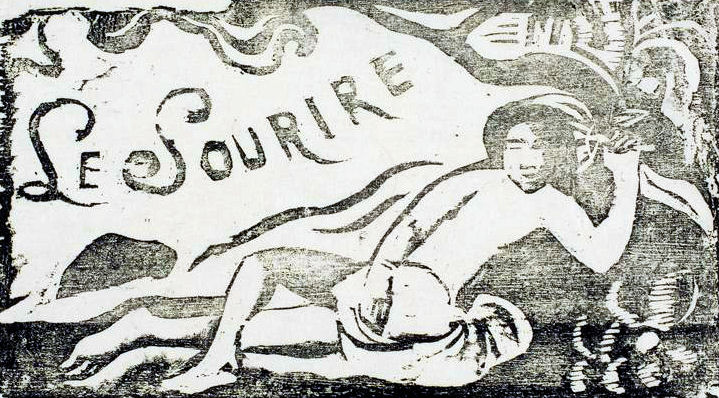
Tahitian Woman

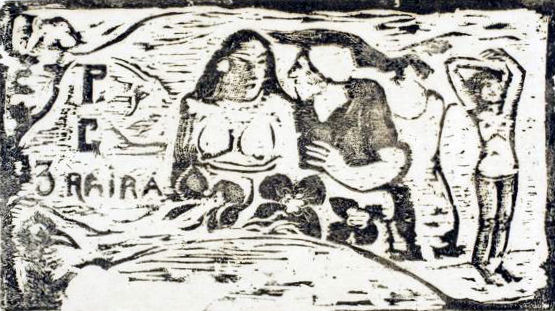
Nude Woman, Man with a White Cap and Small Figure

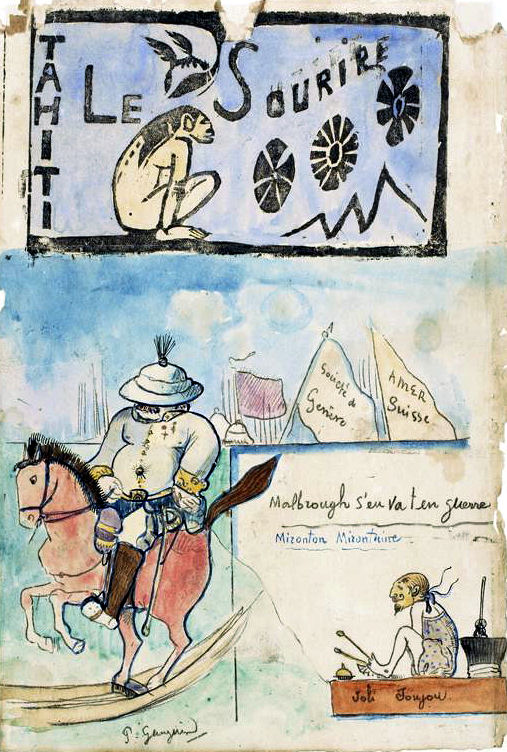
Caricature of Governor Gallet

== Sources ==
- Miller, Ethan. Masterpieces of Impressionism and Post-impressionism. NY: Metropolitan Museum of Art
