= Prado (murderer) =

Prado (also known as “Count Linska de Castillon") (died 28 December 1888) was a Spanish murderer who was guillotined in France.

Prado, who refused to reveal his real name, was brought up in the city of Gijón, Asturias, and had travelled the world by the age of 14. In 1872 he was a sub-lieutenant in a Carlist group during the Carlist Wars and was later wounded at the Battle of Somorrostro. He married his hospital nurse, who died on a trip to the Holy Land. He claimed to have then married a second time in Lima.

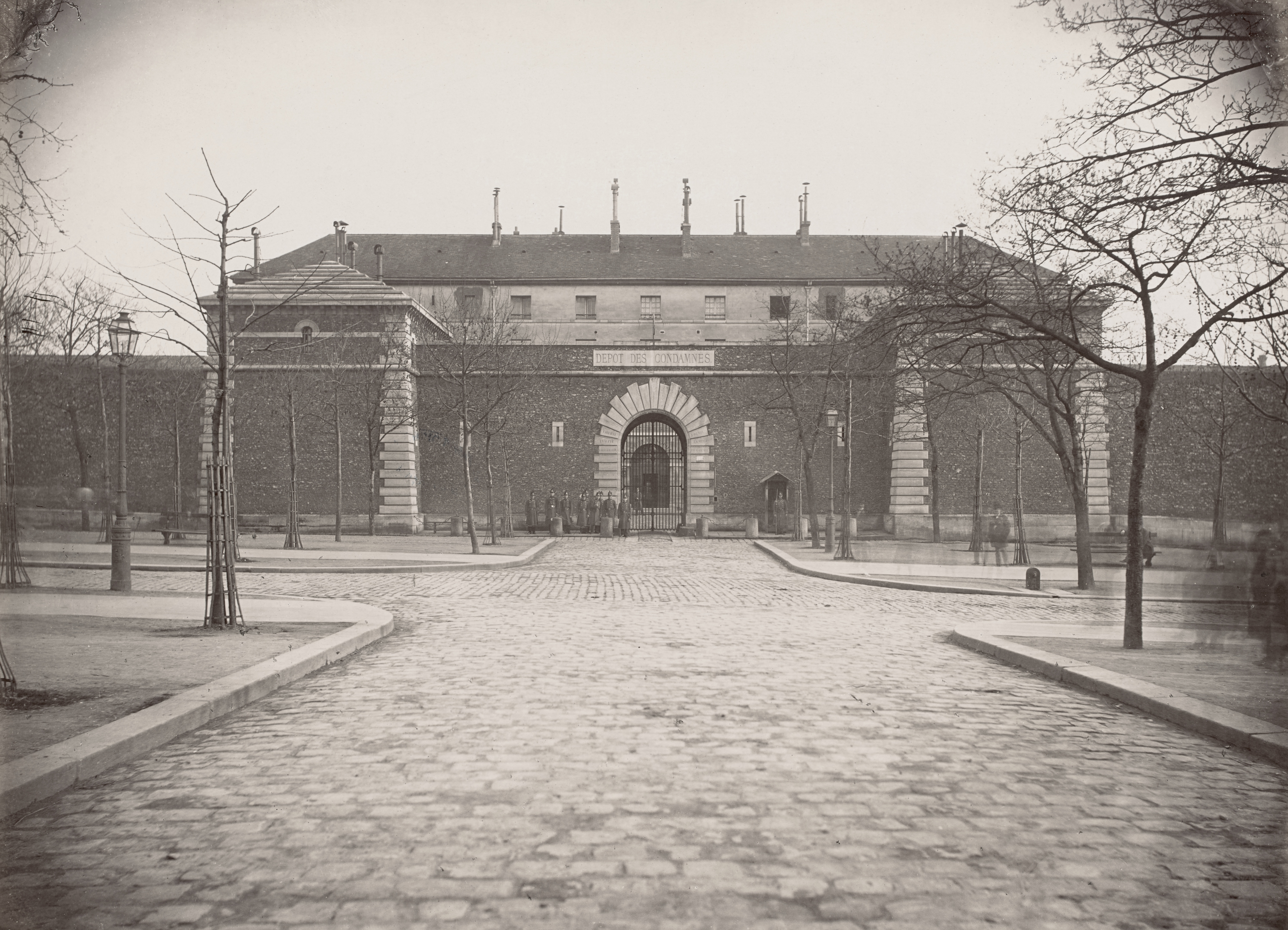
La Roquette prison

He moved to France where he lived off a local girl until cutting the throat of Marie Aguetant, described as his mistress, on 14 January 1886. He was eventually caught, put on trial and sentenced to be executed by guillotine. The execution took place at La Roquette Prison on 28 December 1888, observed by some 200 celebrities with sufficient influence to enter the prison precincts, including Paul Gauguin, Jean Mounet-Sully and Paul Armand Silvestre. A large crowd had assembled outside the prison.

Prado was the topic of conversation in letters between August Strindberg and Friedrich Nietzsche from 1888.
