= Christ in the Garden of Olives (Gauguin) =

Painting by Paul Gauguin

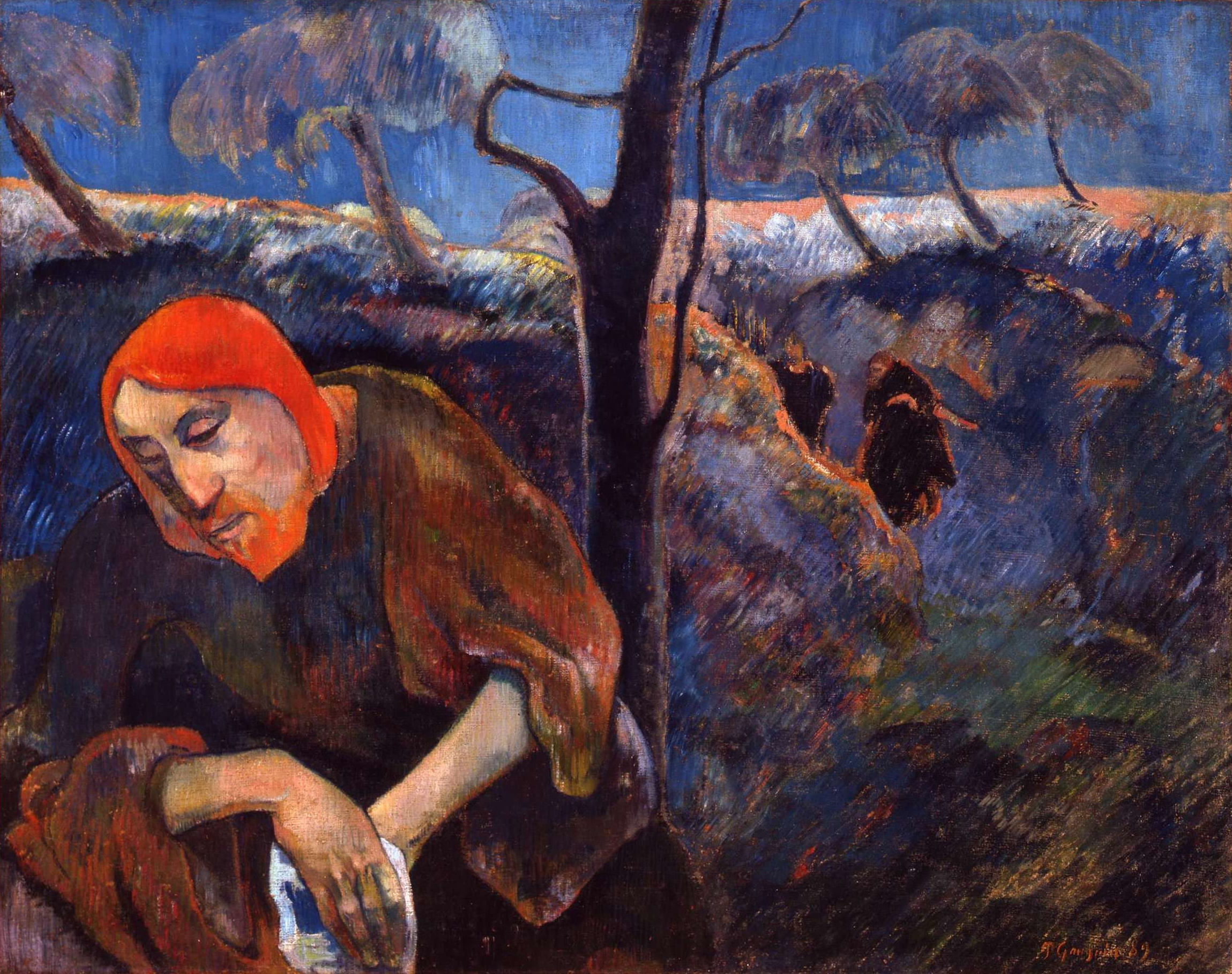
- Gauguin as Christ in the garden
- Artist: Paul Gauguin
- Year: 1889
- Medium: oil on canvas
- Dimensions: 72.4 cm × 91.4 cm (28.5 in × 36.0 in)
- Location: Norton Museum of Art; West Palm Beach, Florida

Christ in the Garden of Olives is an 1889 painting by French artist Paul Gauguin. It is both a self-portrait and a representation of Jesus about to be taken by the soldiers.

== Background ==
Born in France in 1848, Paul Gauguin was an influential Post-Impressionist artist whose work was influential on the Symbolist movement and on all of modern art for many years after his death. An extremely religious person, Gauguin focused most of his work on themes of religion and God. As art historian Thomas Buser writes, "It appears that Gauguin believed in a God who breathed life into an original chaos of insubstantial atoms and thus set nature on her course. By doing so, God materialized himself; and, if God once existed, he is now dead." Having what would have been considered an unconventional belief in religion at the time, the way in which Gauguin dealt with religious themes within his work was unlike his contemporaries. Someone who was intrigued with Theosophy, Gauguin used the relationship between Christ and the world as a metaphor for his own relationship with art. Works like Christ in the Garden of Olives where he directly places himself in the position of Jesus Christ are an example of this. In addition to Christ and other religious themes, towards the latter part of his career and life, a large portion of the works created by Gauguin dealt with his understanding and fetishism of "abnormal peoples."

Relying heavily on abstraction, a major distinction between Gauguin and other post-impressionists during this period, such as Vincent van Gogh, was his belief that artists should not rely on reference images, but instead on their own imagination and memory. Self-Portrait with Halo and Snake, an oil painting on wood completed in 1889, was both a reflection of this and his fixation with portraying himself as Christ. The painting features Gauguin with an elongated neck staring at an object the viewer is not able to see. In addition to his abstract features, he includes a halo above his head. Underneath him the viewer can see a snake directly underneath a pair of apples, alluding to the original sin. According to Wladyslawa Jaworska in The Sacred or the Profane?, "Simultaneously with his bitter feeling that nobody understood him, grew his conviction that he was the "chosen one", "the saviour" and "the redeemer" of modern painting." Gauguin believed that he was chosen to be the savior of modern painting and paintings such as Self-Portrait and Christ in the Garden of Olives show him combining his figure with that of Christ in an effort to strengthen this argument.

== Christ in the Garden of Olives ==
A strangely captivating oil painting, Paul Gauguin’s Christ in the Garden of Olives is a self-portrait that places the artist in place of Christ as he embarks on a journey into the unknown. Creating both a sense of depth and hierarchy, two figures can be seen trailing behind the character in the foreground. In addition to the size and spacing of the figures in the work creating an implied hierarchy, Gauguin purposely depicts the figures in the background without faces in order to ensure that they do not draw attention away from the central figure. Gauguin carefully chooses each brush stroke in order to create a hazy texture, causing the work to almost appear as a vision. Despite using warm colors in order to build the central figure, the background of the work, an outdoor terrain, is composed almost entirely of cool colors. This juxtaposition of colors in this work causes a perfectly balanced piece.

Portraying himself as Christ, this work alludes to Gauguin’s belief that he, like Christ, would eventually perish for the salvation and betterment of his contemporaries. Painted in Le Pouldu in Brittany in November of 1889, Gauguin was emotionally distraught due to his recent failures in Paris shows. In a letter to Emil Schuffenecker, he stated, "The news I get from Paris discourage me so much that I lack the courage to paint and I drag my old body, exposed to the northern wind, along the sea shore in Le Pouldu. Automatically I make a few studies. But my soul is far away and looks sadly into a black abyss that opens in front of me." The central figure in the image, Gauguin is depicted with his head facing the ground and a face full of sorrow and despair due to the rejection he faced.

Placing himself in the position of Christ, Gauguin attempts to liken his suffering to that of the savior and further continues to portray himself as someone who will ultimately be a messenger for his contemporaries, despite being rejected by them. When asked about Christ in the Garden of Olives by critic Jules Huret in 1891, a few years after the completion of the work, Gauguin stated that "it is to symbolize the failure of an ideal, the suffering which was both divine and human, Jesus deserted by all of disciples, and his surroundings are as sad as his soul." This work served as a visual representation of Gauguin’s role as the person chosen to sacrifice himself for the betterment of visual art.

== See also ==
- List of paintings by Paul Gauguin
