= Objet décoratif carré avec dieux tahitiens =

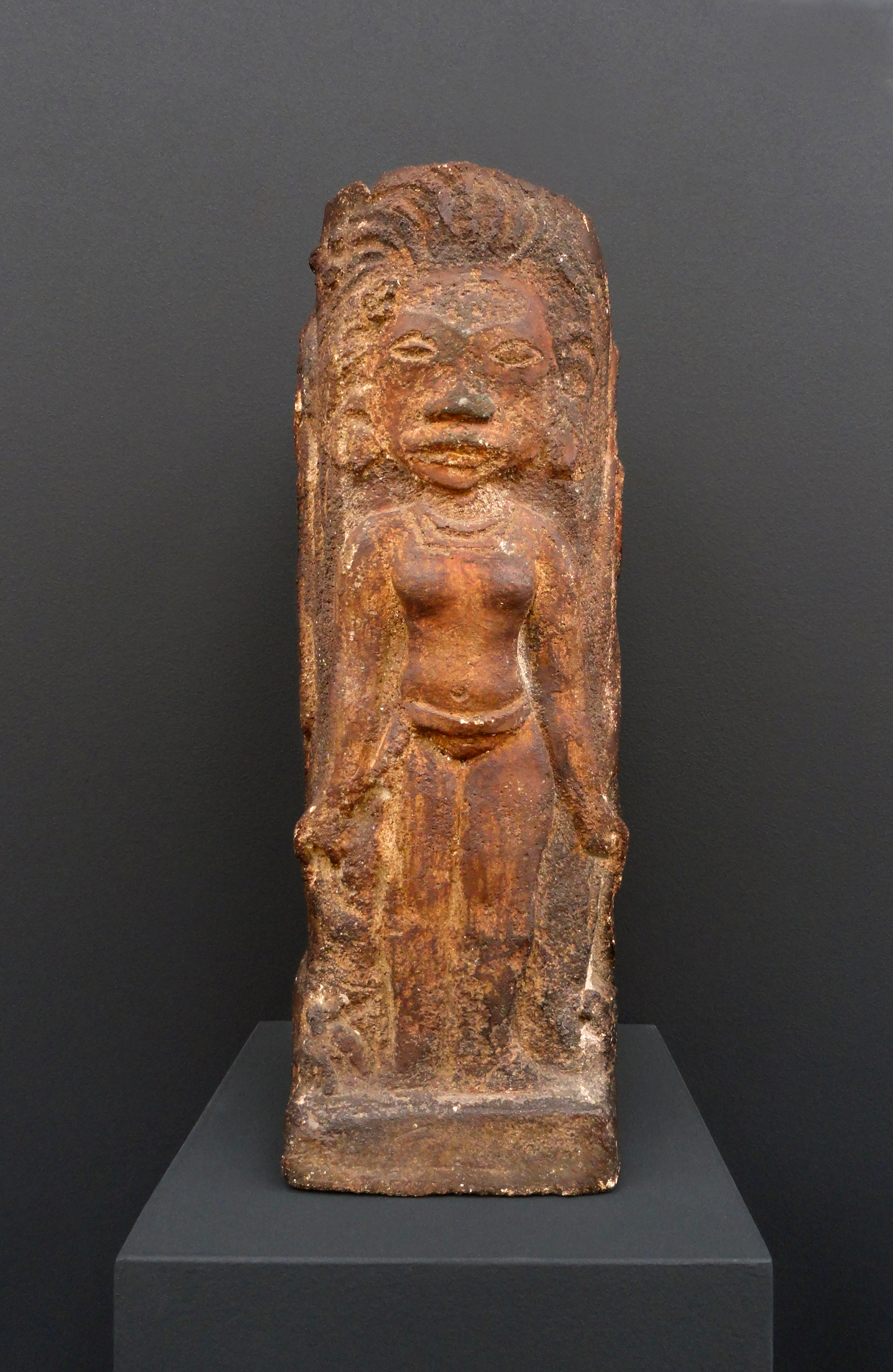
Objet décoratif carré avec dieux tahitiens, 34cm

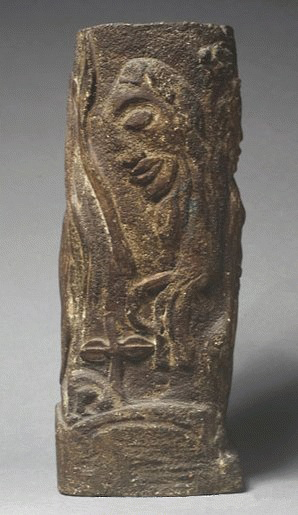
Objet décoratif carré avec dieux tahitiens, 34cm

Objet décoratif carré avec dieux tahitiens (Square Ornament with Tahitian gods) is an 1893-1895 terracotta sculpture by Paul Gauguin, now in the Musée d'Orsay, Paris. It depicts Tahitian goddesses on both sides; one the woman is alert and confronting the viewer, on the other the goddess appears to be at rest and sleeping.
