= George-Daniel de Monfreid =

American-French painter

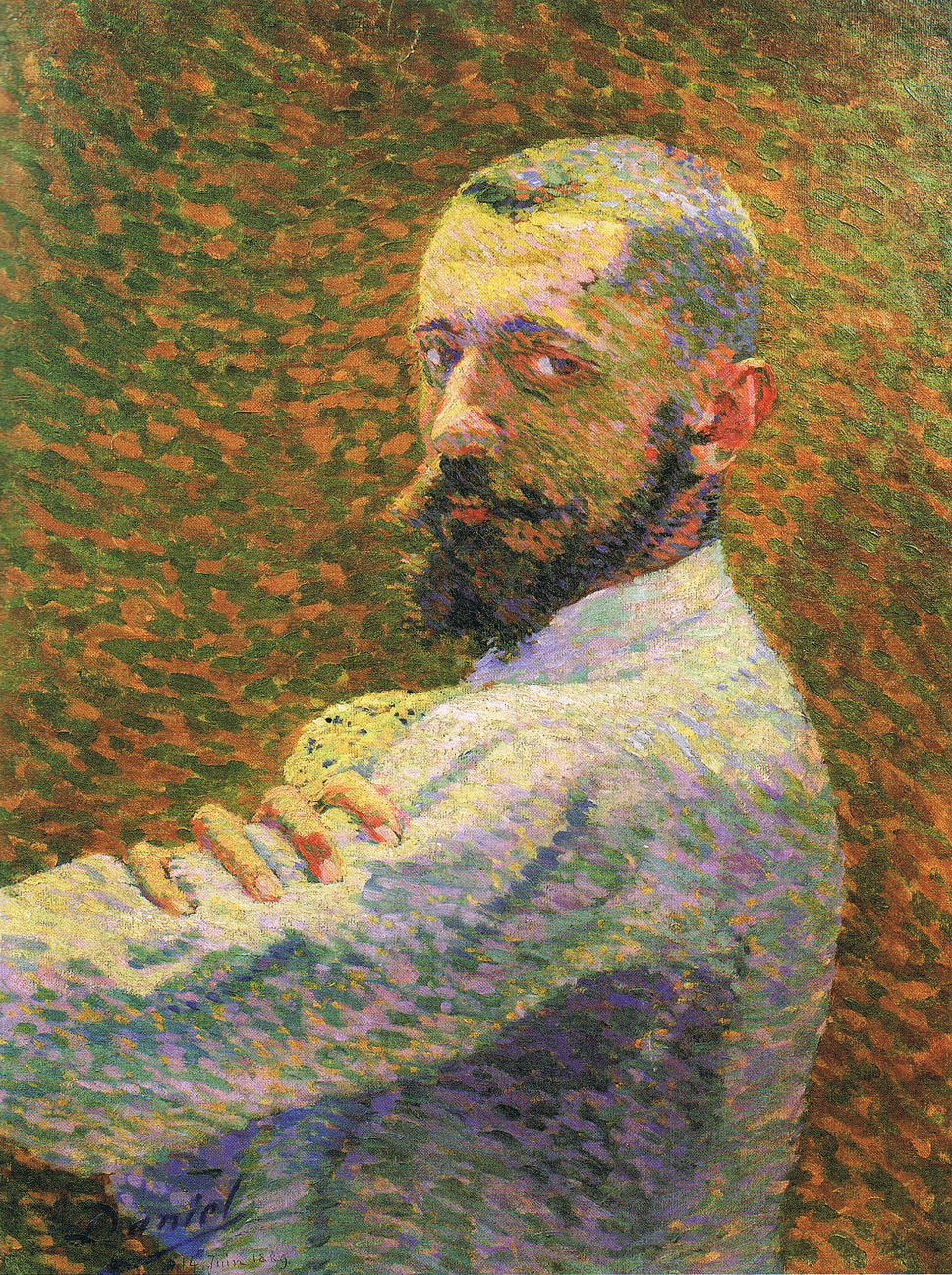
- George-Daniel de Monfreid, Autoportrait à la veste blanche (1889)
- Born: 14 March 1856; New York City, United States
- Died: 26 November 1929 (aged 73); Corneilla-de-Conflent, Pyrénées-Orientales, France
- Movement: Impressionism, Neo-Impressionism, Post-Impressionism
- Children: Henry de Monfreid

George-Daniel de Monfreid (14 March 1856 – 26 November 1929) was a French painter and art collector.

He was born in New York City, in the United States, but spent his childhood in the south of France. Early on he decided on a career in art, and enrolled at the Académie Julian, and formed friendships with Paul Gauguin, Verlaine and Aristide Maillol.

Initially his work was Impressionist and Neo-Impressionist, but his close association with Les Nabis group pushed his style in the direction of Gauguin.

He was also an art collector and a patron of the arts. Along with Gustave Fayet, he was one of the first collectors of the works of Gauguin at the time he was living in the Pacific. He was also one of the first biographers of Gauguin. He was also influenced by the cubism of Pablo Picasso late in his career. He died in Corneilla-de-Conflent in 1929.

== Gallery ==
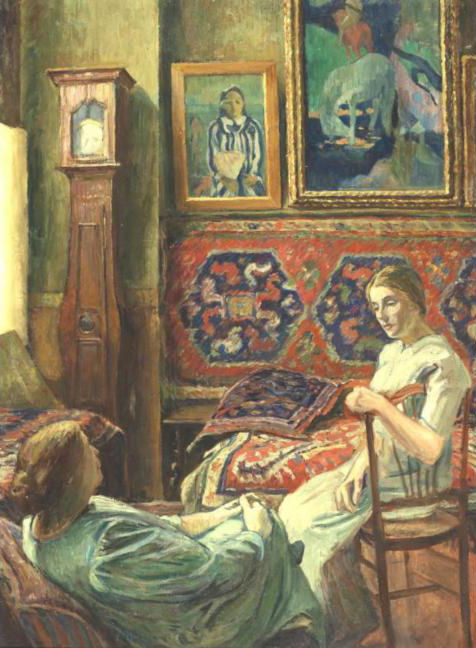
Conversation in the Atelier.

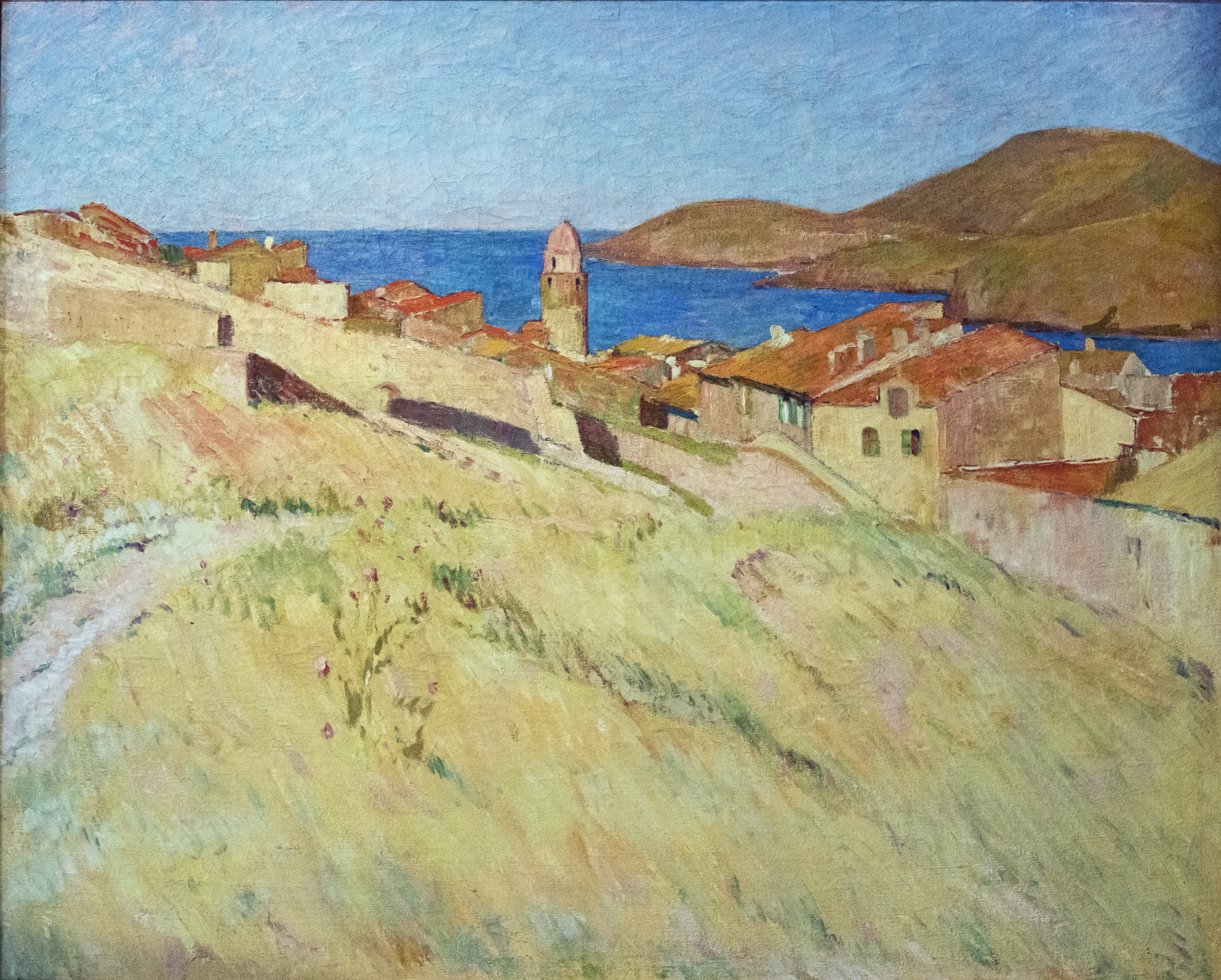
Landscape of Collioure Musée Toulouse-Lautrec Albi
