= Gustave Fayet =

French painter (1865–1925)

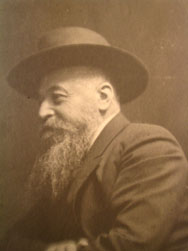

Gustave Fayet (Béziers, 20 May 1865 – Carcassonne, 24 September 1925) was a French painter. His work is close in style to that of Paul Gauguin or Odilon Redon. He learnt to draw and paint with his father, Gabriel Fayet, and his uncle Léon Fayet, who both admired pre-impressionnist painters such as Adolphe Monticelli or Camille Corot. Gustave Fayet's style is very personal, far from impressionism or academic work, rather more symbolism. Gustave Fayet was also an art collector, he owned works by Degas, Manet, Pissarro and above all Paul Gauguin. Fayet was in fact one of Gauguin's main clients and he lent many of the paintings in his collection for the Gauguin exhibitions between 1903 and 1925. In 1908, he bought the Abbaye de Fontfroide (near Narbonne, France), that he reconstructed and where he exhibited many of the paintings from his collection, among them "Day" and "Night" by Odilon Redon.

Fayet was a man with a universal curiosity and his work reflects this by a rich variety of styles and techniques. His works remain mainly in private collections and are not widely known by the public. However, since 2005 a "Fayet Room" has been opened in the Abbaye de Fontfroide and in 2006 the museum of Elne (near Perpignan, south of France) held a retrospective exhibition of Fayet's work.

From 9 October 2026 to 8 March 2027, the Fondation Louis Vuitton exhibited Gustave Fayet, Collector – Artist Designer. The exhibit displayed “more than 250 works from Gustave Fayet’s extraordinary collection, now dispersed around the world. They are presented alongside 374 of his own creations, most of them never before exhibited and specially restored for the occasion.”
