= 2026 Indonesia's Horse Racing Season =

- Sport: Horse Racing
- Duration: February 15 - December 6, 2026

Seasons
- ← 2025 2027 →

The 2026 Indonesia's Horse Racing Season is the ongoing national level Indonesian horse racing season in 2026. There are eight events planned for the season, held between February 15 to December 6 of 2026. The events are sanctioned by the Equestrian Association of Indonesia (PORDASI) and run by event organizers, SARGA.CO. Their official website can be found at sarga.co.

== Overview ==
=== Major race results ===
Jateng Derby	Triple Crown I	Pertiwi Cup	Triple Crown II	MN Cup
3yo Derby 1600m	3yo Derby 1200m	3yo Fillies 1600m	3yo Derby 1600m	Open 2000m HC
Nara Eclipse	Maxi of Khalim	Fiona of Khalim	Saga Serumpun	Princess Gavi
Meikel Soleran	Jemmy Runtu	Jemmy Runtu	Angel Manarisip	Jemmy Runtu
Paku Alam Cup	Indonesia Derby	Super Sprint	Star of Stars	King HBX Cup
Open 2000m HC	3yo Derby 2000m	Class A 1300m	Class A 2200m	Open TBD
Naga Sembilan				
Achmad Saefudin				

=== Season summary ===
==== Preseason ====
SARGA.CO officially announced the 2026 calendar on 27 January 2026. The calendar has eight events, which includes the Jateng Derby, the Triple Crown series, the Pertiwi Cup, the Indonesia Derby, and both Kejurnas series. It also introduced a new series, the King's Cup, which includes the Mangkunegara X Cup, the Paku Alam Cup, and the King Hamengkubuwono X Cup. The season will span from 15 February to 6 December 2026, and will be held in five racecourses across Yogyakarta, Central Java, West Java, West Sumatra, and North Sulawesi.

On 2 February 2025, SARGA.CO announced a collaboration with AFASEC, a French non-profit organization focused on the professional development of human resources in the horse racing industry. The memorandum of undersranding (MoU) of the collaboration was signed four days earlier, and aims to develop Indonesia's horse racing industry and its human resources. The collaboration was part of a larger strategic partnership agreement between the Equestrian Association of Indonesia (PORDASI) and the French Horse and Riding Institute (IFCE) which also included the French Equestrian Federation (FFE), France Galop, and AFASEC. The announcement also included plans to build a racecourse in Jakarta with the help of AFASEC and French Cheval Services.

==== Season opener: Jateng Derby ====
The inaugural race of the season was the 2026 Jateng Derby. The event was held at Tegalwaton Racecourse in Semarang Regency, Central Java, near Salatiga. Prior to the event, several safety concerns were raised on social media, particularly Facebook, regarding the track, which was reportedly not up to national standards. In the previous season's edition of the Jateng Derby, in the main race, a collision happened and killed two race horses, Milord and Salvator Minang, and injured both of their jockeys.

The Jateng Derby races were ultimately held on Sunday, 15 February 2026, with minor races being held the day before. The main race was the 16th race, the 3yo Derby, known as the Jateng Derby. The favourite for the race was Monochrome of Miranda Stable. Milea Guti, a filly from West Sumatra who won the Sawahlunto Derby in December 2025, was withdrawn just before the gate draw. The race ended with Nara Eclipse from Eclipse Stable winning by over 8 lengths ahead of Sir Orbit with P. Putra Borneo (dh. Virtuoso All Star) finishing in third place by a nose length. Nara Eclipse had previously won twice in national races held at Tegalwaton Racecourse.

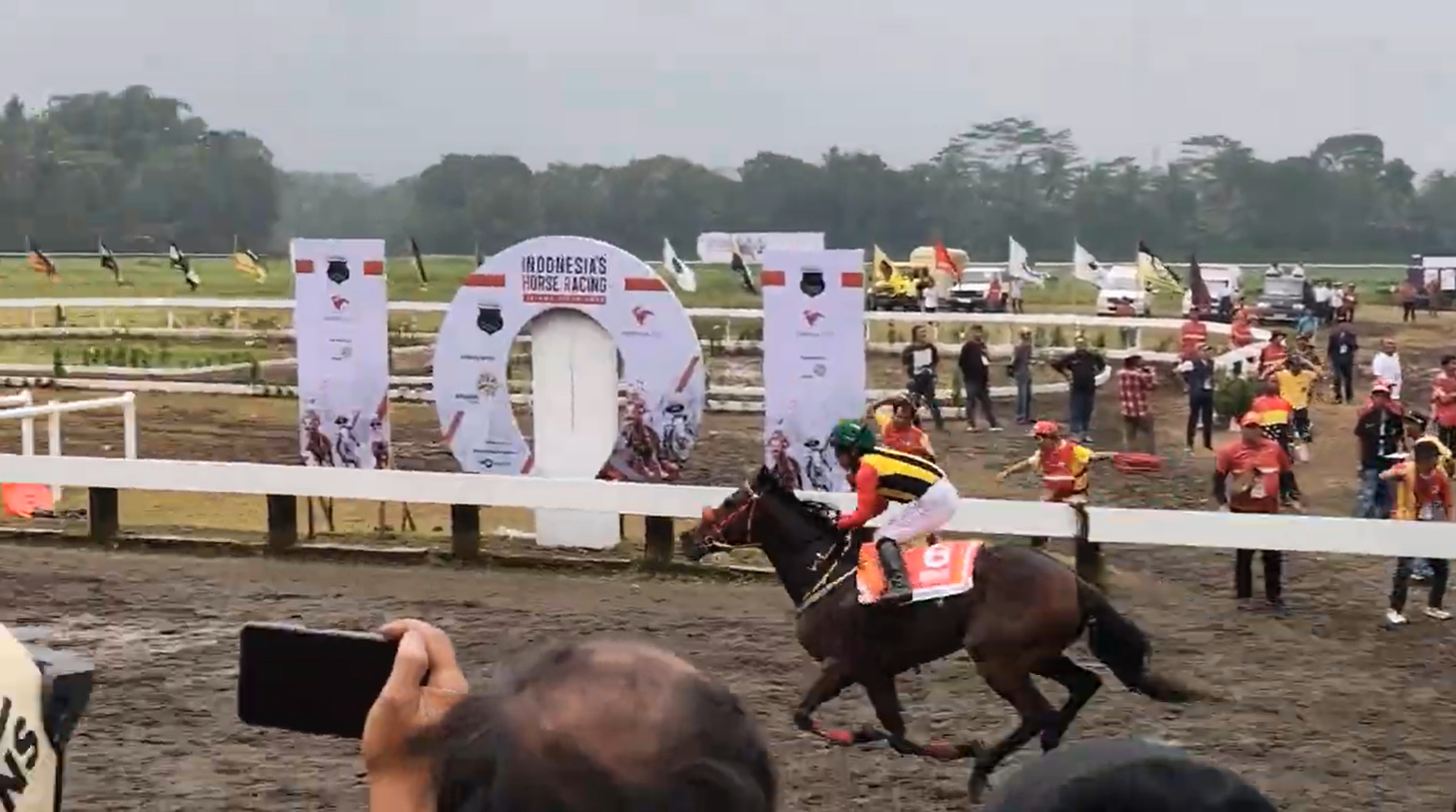
Nara Eclipse, jockeyed by Meikel Soleran, moments before crossing the finish line to win the Jateng Derby.

Other notable races in the Jateng Derby included the ninth race, the open sprint, which had Dominator, who had lost by a nose to Princess Gavi in the 2025 Super Sprint, winning over Princess Gavi. Another was the 18th race, the open 2000 meters, which had Naga Sembilan winning over Romantic Spartan and Queen Divona.

==== Early Triple Crown and King's Cup races ====
The first Triple Crown series race and the Indonesia Oaks (Pertiwi Cup) were held on the 4th of April at Sultang Agung Racecourse as the second calendar event of the season. Former Indonesian national football team head coach, Shin Tae-yong, made an appearance at the event as a guest star. The 1200 meter long Triple Crown I race was won by Maxi of Khalim by around half a length ahead of Kana Eclipse. Similarly, the Pertiwi Cup, a classic race alongside the Indonesia Derby, was won by Fiona of Khalim by around half a length ahead of Nara Eclipse. Both Maxi of Khalim and Fiona of Khalim are owned by Kusnadi Halim of King Halim Stable. This marked a repetition of the 2025 season, in which King Halim Stable horses won both the Triple Crown I and the Pertiwi Cup.

On Sunday, 10 May 2026, the Mangkunegaran Cup was held for the first time in modern Indonesia. The event was held alongside the Triple Crown II race, and was attended by the Duke Mangkunegara X himself. Among the favourites of the Triple Crown II race were Maxi of Khalim, who had won the Triple Crown I race and was aiming for a Triple Crown title, and Nara Eclipse, the Jateng Derby winner who had never lost a race at Tegalwaton Racecourse. Another entry was Saga Serumpun, a West Sumatran horse who had just moved up from the Juvenile class to the Derby class. The race ended up being won by front runner Saga Serumpun in a three-way nose-length upset between Saga Serumpun, King Asva, and Nara Eclipse. Between first to second place and second to third place are only three and two hundredths of a second respectively. Saga Serumpun's win ensures no Triple Crown winner in 2026.

The first King's Cup race, the Mangkunegaran Cup, was held as an open 2000 meter handicap race. The favourite of the race, Naga Sembilan, was disqualified before the race for not entering the starting gate. The race and the Mangkunegaran Cup title was eventually won by Princess Gavi.

== Schedule ==
2026 Indonesia's Horse Racing Season
Date	Event	Venue	Series		
Date	Event	Venue	Triple Crown	Kejurnas	King's Cup
15 February	Jateng Derby 2026	Tegalwaton Racecourse, Central Java			
4 April	Triple Crown Seri I & Pertiwi Cup 2026	Sultan Agung Racecourse, DI Yogyakarta	Yes		
10 May	Mangkunegaran Cup & Triple Crown Seri II 2026	Tegalwaton Racecourse, Central Java	Yes		Yes
14 June	Paku Alam Cup 2026	Sultan Agung Racecourse, DI Yogyakarta			Yes
26 July	60th Kejurnas Seri I - Indonesia Derby 2026	Legokjawa Racecourse, West Java	Yes	Yes	
23 August	Indonesia's Horse Racing Cup I 2026	West Sumatra			
25 October	60th Kejurnas Seri II & PP PORDASI Chairman Cup 2026	Maesa Tompaso Racecourse, North Sulawesi		Yes	
6 December	King Hamengkubuwono X Cup 2026	Sultan Agung Racecourse, DI Yogyakarta			Yes

== Results ==
There were a total of nine events.

- **Bold** = Major Race

=== Jateng Derby 2026 ===
Venue: Tegalwaton Racecourse

Race					Winner					
Order	Classification	Distance	Sponsor	Purse	Horse	Contg.	Jockey	Trainer	Owner	Stable
Main Races (Age Classified)
16	**3yo Derby Div.I** **(Jateng Derby)**	1600m	SARGA.CO	Rp100,000,000	Nara Eclipse	Central Java	Meikel Soleran	Rulli Soleran	Ir. Iman Hartono	(Eclipse Stable)
15	3yo Derby Div.II	1600m	Arsari Tambang	Rp45,000,000	Whoosh Agis	East Java	Kenny F Ngion	M. Himawan	Perintis	Perintis Stable
11	3yo Juve. Div.I	1400m	SARGA.CO	Rp50,000,000	Kana Eclipse	Central Java	Meikel Soleran	Rulli Soleran	Ir. Iman Hartono	Eclipse Stable
10	3yo Juve. Div.II	1400m	JHL	Rp25,000,000	Danantara	West Java	Falentino Sangian	Rulli Soleran	H.E Rosadi Masoem S.H., M.H	Manglayang Stable
4	2yo Junior	1000m	JHL	Rp15,000,000	Paco Eclipse	Central Java	Meikel Soleran	Rulli Soleran	Imelda Margaretha Hartono	Eclipse Stable
3	2yo Maiden A/B	1000m	JAPFA	Rp15,000,000	Banurasmi	West Java	Joulan Maleke	Tenni Rori	Lyra Sabria	Aragon Stable
1	2yo Maiden C/D	800m	SARGA.CO	Rp10,000,000	Roman The King	West Java	Ahmad Fauzi	Karlan	Kusnadi Halim	King Halim Stable
6	2yo Maiden KPI	1000m	JHL	Rp15,000,000	Aquinsa Aurora	East Java	Fajar Anggun	M. Himawan	H. Syamsyudin	Indah Stable
17	Indonesian Thoroughbreds	1600m	JHL	Rp20,000,000	Sunglow Nagari	East Kalimantan	Yosua Meikel Rori	Novi Telew	H. Indra Aridhawansyah	Wining Stable
13	Foreign Thoroughbreds	1600m	Arsari Tambang	Rp20,000,000	Cronos Eclipse	Central Java	Hesky Paendong	Rulli Soleran	Imelda & Andi Abriana Shanum	Eclipse Stable
Height Classified Races
18	Open	2000m	Arsari Tambang	Rp50,000,000	Naga Sembilan	Central Jakarta	Achmad Saefudin	Bagus Haryanto	Ny. Raihana Bagus	Red Stone Stable
9	Open Sprint	1300m	SARGA.CO	Rp30,000,000	Dominator	DKI Jakarta	Angel Manarisip	Ardhi Wijaya	Djatmiko Adi Nugroho	Ciello Stable
14	Class C	1600m	Blue Blood Stable	Rp22,500,000	Dragon	East Java	Rizki Nugraha	Jhoni Ratu	Saiful Bahri & Lukmanul Hakim	Bintang Madura Stable
7	Class C Sprint	1100m	Arsari Tambang	Rp22,500,000	Kamaka Eclipse	Central Java	Hesky Paendong	Rulli Soleran	Ir. Iman Hartono	Eclipse Stable
12	Class D	1400m	JAPFA	Rp20,000,000	Arceus Nagari	DKI Jakarta	Achmad Saefudin	Wahyu Wicaksono	Aryo P.S Djojohadikusumo	Sarga Stable
5	Class D Sprint	1000m	JAPFA	Rp20,000,000	Better Sweet	East Java	Rizki Nugraha	Joni Ratu	Siti Nuraini-Yenny	Cahaya Bulan Stable
8	Class E	1200m	Blue Blood Stable	Rp10,000,000	P. Super Montong	South Kalimantan	Salman Farid	Ardhi Wijaya	Shella Putri Mahardika	BHM Stable
2	Class F	1000m	Blue Blood Stable	Rp7,500,000	Kasmaran	DKI Jakarta	Agung Saidil	Ardhi Wijaya	Windika	Adem Ayem Stable
Minor Races
	2yo Maiden C/D Heat II	800m	-	Rp10,000,000	Vegas Eclipse	Central Java	Hesky Paendong	Rulli Soleran	Imelda Margaretha Hartono	Eclipse Stable
	Class F Heat II	1000m	-	Rp7,000,000	Dicaprio	West Java	Iqbal Rahmadias	Tantan Firmansyah	Edlyn	Van Doe Loer Stable
	Class G	1000m	-	Rp5,000,000	Falling In Love	DKI Jakarta	Agung Saidil	Ardhi Wijaya	Suwandi	Maju Jaya Stable
	Class H	1000m	-	Rp5,000,000	Power Rangers	East Java	Zainul Fanani	Firmansyah Candra	H. Nurul Huda	Cahaya Mulya Stable
	Class I/J	1000m	-	Rp5,000,000	Mc Queen	West Java	Jaka Septian	Tantan Firmansyah	Edlyn	Van Doe Loer Stable

==== Jateng Derby - Results ====
Finish	No	Horse	Contg.	Gate	Jockey	Trainer	Owner	Stable	Time	Winnings
1	6	Nara Eclipse	Central Java	11	Meikel Soleran	Rulli Soleran	Ir. Iman Hartono	Eclipse Stable		Rp45,000,000
2	5	Sir Orbit	West Sumatra	3	Trully Pantow	Tuan Amris	M. Arif Nurmatias	Emeral Stable		Rp22,500,000
3	4	P. Putra Borneo*	South Kalimantan	7	Risky Rorimpandey	Steven Singal	Sheila P, Mahardika	BHM Stable		Rp12,500,000
4	1	Monochrome	North Sulawesi	10	Jones Paendong	Steven Paendong	Nico Kanter	Miranda Stable		
5	2	Aurora of Khalim	West Java	8	Hanny Suoth	Karlan	Kusnadi Halim	King Halim Stable		
6	3	Maxi of Khalim	West Java	2	Jemmy Runtu	Karlan	Kusnadi Halim	King Halim Stable		
7	12	Rajo Pasopati	DKI Jakarta	12	Falentino Sangian	Lili Momuat	Gumirlang Wicaksono	Rama Sinta Stable		
8	9	Ratu Adara**	DKI Jakarta	9	Ended Rahmat	Lili Momuat	Nn. Adara Tifani	Rama Sinta Stable		
9	8	Cassius Warrior	East Java	6	Bramantio Turangan	Agus Widodo	Bambang K. Istanto	Amigo Stable		
10	11	MS King	North Sulawesi	1	Yoshua Meikel Rori	Steven Paendong	Adrian N. Supit	Miranda Stable		
11	10	Bulan Sabit	DI Yogyakarta	5	Fajar Walangitan	Swingly Soleran	Ade M. Al Bukhari	Bullion 99 Stable		
DNS	7	P. Bintang Sakti	South Kalimantan	4	Marcel Ratu	Lili Momuat	Sheila P. Mahardika	BHM Stable		
*dh. Virtuoso All Star; **dh. Secret Weapon

=== Triple Crown Seri I & Pertiwi Cup 2026 ===
Venue: Sultan Agung Racecourse

Race					Winner					
Order	Classification	Distance	Sponsor	Purse	Horse	Contg.	Jockey	Trainer	Owner	Stable
Age Classified
13	**3yo Derby** **(Triple Crown I)**	1200m	SARGA.CO	Rp110,000,000	Maxi of Khalim	West Java	Jemmy Runtu	Karlan	Kusnadi Halim	King Halim Stable
16	**3yo Fillies** **(Pertiwi Cup)**	1600m	Arsari Tambang	Rp110,000,000	Fiona of Khalim	West Java	Jemmy Runtu	Karlan	Kusnadi Halim	King Halim Stable
10	3yo Juve. Div.I	1400m	SARGA.CO	Rp50,000,000	Saga Serumpun	West Sumatra	Angel Manarisip	Sip	Sasril	Serumpun Grup
9	3yo Juve. Div.II	1400m	Japfa	Rp30,000,000	Askara	Yogyakarta	Fajar Walangitan	Tenny Rori	Ade Abhideka	Bullion 99 Stable
12	2yo Junior A/B	1200m	Pertamina	Rp17,500,000	Paco Eclipse	Central Java	Meikel Soleran	Rulli Soleran	Imelda Margaretha Hartono	Eclipse Stable
4	2yo Junior C/D	1000m	PLN	Rp17,500,000	Roman the King	West Java	Fajar Walangitan	Karlan	Kusnadi Halim	King Halim Stable
2	2yo Maiden A/B	1000m	Pertamina	Rp17,500,000	Alaron Nagari	North Sulawesi	Falentino Sangian	Mario Bahar	Irfan Bahar	Bendang Stable
17	2yo Maiden C/D	800m	PLN	Rp10,000,000	Marino the King	West Java	Hanny South	Karlan	Kusnadi Halin	King Halim Stable
3	2yo Maiden KPI	1000m	Blue Blood Stable	Rp17,500,000	Atila T.A	Central Java	Agus Setiono	Muchamad Rizal	M. Nadhif Zhafi Alaia	Tombo Ati Stable
14	3yo+ Indonesian Thoroughbreds	1600m	Arsari Tambang	Rp22,500,000	Vaux Theater	Jakarta	Kenny F. Ngion	Gelry Helyana	Achmad Huraera N.	Sari Mukti Dengang Stable
Height Classified
18	Open	2000m	JHL	Rp35,000,000	Naga Sembilan	Jakarta	Achmad Saefudin	Bagus Haryanto	Ny. Raihana	Red Stone Stable
7	Open Sprint	1300m	Japfa	Rp25,000,000	Dominator	Jakarta	Angel Manarisip	Ardhi Wijaya	Djatmiko Adi Nugroho	Cielo Stable
15	Class C	1600m	Japfa	Rp25,000,000	Flamboyan	East Java	Angel Manarisip	Nicky Pantouw	Sentot DJ	Nona Dindy Stable
6	Class C Sprint	1100m	SARGA.CO	Rp25,000,000	Chel'leng Manis	East Java	Rizky Nugraha	Dadang Suhendar	M. Saud	Suramadu Stable
8	Class D	1400m	JHL	Rp20,000,00	Lady Baharna	Jakarta	Achmad Saefudin	Steven Joseph	Ny. Raihana	Red Stone Stable
5	Class D Sprint	1000m	Arsari Tambang	Rp20,000,000	Ravelio	Jakarta	Ended Rahmat	Supendi	Topan Firmansyah	Batu Kereta Stable
11	Class E	1200m	Blue Blood Stable	Rp12,500,000	Artemis	Jakarta	Salman Farid	Ardhi Wijaya	Yudi	BYD Stable
1	Class F	1000m	JHL	Rp10,000,000	Hercules	West Java	Falentino Sangian	Rully Soleran	E. Rosadi Ma'soem	Manglayang Stable

==== Triple Crown I - Results ====
Finish	No	Horse	Contg.	Gate	Jockey	Trainer	Owner	Stable	Time	Winnings
1	5	Maxi of Khalim	West Java	4	Jemmy Runtu	Karlan	Kusnadi Halim	King Halim Stable	1:19.95	Rp49,500,000
2	7	Kana Eclipse	Central Java	6	Meikel Soleran	Rulli Soleran	Ir. Iman Hartono	Eclipse Stable	1:20.06	Rp24,750,000
3	3	Monochrome	North Sulawesi	9	Jones Paendong	Stevin P Paendong	Nico Kanter	Miranda Stable	1:20.23	Rp13,750,000
4	4	Aurora of Khalim	West Java	11	Hanny Suoth	Karlan	Kusnadi Halim	King Halim Stable	1:20.81	
5	6	Suntora Berjaya*	DKI Jakarta	1	Kenny F Ngion	Wahyu Wicaksono	Sarjono Ibnu Darmo	Aisyah Berjaya Stable	1.:20.97	
6	1	Milea Guti	West Sumatra	8	Fajar Walangitan	Syafinal	Wahyu Kurniawan	Guti Stable	1:21.25	
7	2	Sir Orbit	West Sumatra	5	Trully Pantow	Tuan Amris	M. Arif Nurmatias	Emeral Stable	1:21.28	
8	12	Cassius Warrior	East Java	7	Bramantio Turangan	Agus Widodo	Bambang K Istanto	Amigo Stable	1:23.00	
9	9	Rajo Pasopati	DKI Jakarta	10	Achmad Saefudin	Raymond Tambaani	Alfiandara Yahya Putra	Djangkar Bumi Stable	1:23.07	
10	10	Sunpower Nagari	North Sulawesi	12	Falentino Sangian	Mario Bahar	Irfan Bahar	Bendang Stable	1:23.84	
11	11	Ratu Adara**	DKI Jakarta	2	Joulan Maleke	Lili Momuat	Nona Adara Tifani	Adara Stable	1:25.80	
DNF	8	Agam Senator	DI Yogyakarta	3	Angel Manarisip	Nick Pantow	Ade Abhideka	Bullion 99 Stable	-	
*dh. Suntora Nagari; **dh. Secret Weapon

==== Pertiwi Cup - Results ====
Finish	No	Horse	Contg.	Gate	Jockey	Trainer	Owner	Stable	Time	Winnings
1	5	Fiona of Khalim	West Java	4	Jemmy Runtu	Karlan	Kusnadi Halim	King Halim Stable		Rp49,500,000
2	1	Nara Eclipse	Central Java	5	Meikel Soleran	Rulli Soleran	Ir. Iman Hartono	Eclipse Stable		Rp24,750,000
3	6	P. Kenangan Sion	South Kalimantan	1	Risky Rorypandey	Rian Firmansyah	Sheila P. Mahardika	BHM & Djon's Stable		Rp13,750,000
4	4	Burrito Libre	East Java	2	Rizky Nugraha	Jhoni Ratu	Saiful Bahri & Lukmanul Hakim	Bintang Madura Stable		
5	2	Whoosh Agis	East Java	7	Kenny F, Ngion	M. Himawan	Perintis	Perintis Stable		
6	3	P. Bintang Sakti	South Kalimantan	6	Risky Rorypandey	Lili Momuat	Sheila P. Mahardika	BHM Stable		
DNS	7	Melody Hosana	East Java	3	Bramantio Turangan	Agus Widodo	Bambang Istanto	Amigo Stable		

=== Mangkunegara X Cup & Triple Crown Seri II 2026 ===
Venue: Tegalwaton Racecourse

Race					Winner					
Order	Classification	Distance	Sponsor	Purse	Horse	Contg.	Jockey	Trainer	Owner	Stable
Age Classified
16	**3yo Derby Div.I** **(Triple Crown II)**	1600m	SARGA.CO	Rp120,000,000	Saga Serumpun	West Sumatra	Angel Manarisip	Nicky Pantow	Sasril S.E.	Serumpun Stable
13	3yo Derby Div.II	1600m	Pertamina	Rp50,000,000	P. Putri Barbara	South Kalimantan	Risky Rorimpandey	Steven Singal	Shella Putri Mahardika	BHM Stable
12	3yo Juve. Div.I	1400m	Arsari Tambang	Rp70,000,000	Fiona of Khalim	West Java	Jemmy Runtu	Karlan	Kusnadi Halim	King Halim Stable
7	2yo Junior A/B Div.I	1200m	Daum Crystal	Rp25,000,000	Paco Eclipse	Central Java	Meikel Soleran	Rulli Soleran	Imelda Margaretha Hartono	Eclipse Stable
10	2yo Junior A/B Div.II	1200m	Pertamina	Rp20,000,000	Red Sparta	East Java	Yanni Rondonuwu	Yori Lampus	H. Hasyim	HAR Jaya Stable
2	2yo Junior C/D	1000m	JAPFA	Rp20,000,000	Milana Eclipse	Central Java	Meikel Soleran	Rully Soleran	Ir. Iman Hartono	Eclipse Stable
8	2yo Junior KPI	1200m	Bank Mandiri	Rp25,000,000	Alacros Nagari	North Sulawesi	Falentino Sangian	Mario Bahar	Irfan Bahar	Bendang Stable
3	2yo Maiden A/B	1000m	Blue Blood Stable	Rp20,000,000	Turob Inat T.A	Central Java	Yanni Rondonuwu	Kusno Briliantoro	M Nadhif Zhafi Alaia	Tombo Ati Stable
18	2yo Maiden C/D	800m	Arsari Tambang	Rp20,000,000	Scarlett The Queen	West Java	Ersan Saputra	Karlan	Kendro Purnomo	King Halim Stable
9	2yo Indonesian Thoroughbreds	1600m	SARGA.CO	Rp25,000,000	P. Tujuh	South Kalimantan	Marcel Ratu	Raymond Tambaani	Shella Putri Mahardika	BHM Stable
Height Classified
17	**Open Handicap (Mangkunegaran Cup)**	2000m	SARGA.CO	Rp50,000,000	Princess Gavi	West Java	Jemmy Runtu	Karlan	Kusnadi Halim	King Halim Stable
11	Open Sprint Handicap	1200m	Arsari Tambang	Rp40,000,000	War Kudeta	West Java	Jemmy Runtu	Karlan	Kusnadi Halim	King Halim Stable
15	Class B	1600m	Bank Mandiri	Rp25,000,000	Agatha Star	East Java	Yonatan Langi	Ndenna Ngara	Atan Jannata	Jatinom Indah Stable
14	Class C	1600m	Aquviva	Rp22,500,000	Arceus Nagari	DKI Jakarta	Achmad Saefudin	Steven Joseph	Aryo P.S Djojohadikusumo	Sarga Stable
4	Class C Sprint	1100m	TOP Coffee	Rp22,500,000	Better Sweet	East Java	Rizky Nugraha	Joni Ratu	Yenny	Cahaya Bulan Stable
6	Class D	1200m	JAPFA	Rp20,000,00	Lady Baharna	DKI Jakarta	Achmad Saefudin	Steven Joseph	Ny. Raihana	Red Stone Stable
5	Class E	1200m	Blue Blood Stable	Rp15,000,000	Artemis	DKI Jakarta	Salman Farid	Ardhi Wijaya	H. Yudi Bireun	Aragon Stable
1	Class F	1000m	Bank Mandiri	Rp10,000,000	Hercules	West Java	Falentino Sangian	H. E Rosadi Ma'soem	H. E. Rosadi Ma'soem	Manglayang Stable

==== Triple Crown II - Results ====
Finish	No	Horse	Contg.	Gate	Jockey	Trainer	Owner	Stable	Time	Winnings
1	10	Saga Serumpun	West Sumatra	7	Angel Manarisip	Nicky Pantow	Sasril, S.E.	Serumpun Stable	1:46.63	Rp54,000,000
2	4	King Asva*	West Java	9	Abdul Majid	Rizky Saddak	Kiandra Sudarmadi	PAS Team	1:46.66	Rp27,000,000
3	3	Nara Eclipse	Central Java	1	Meikel Soleran	Rully Soleran	Ir. Iman Hartono	Eclipse Stable	1:46.68	Rp15,000,000
4	1	Maxi of Khalim	West Java	4	Jemmy Runtu	Karlan	Kusnadi Halim	King Halim Stable	1:47.04	
5	9	Sir Orbit	West Sumatra	10	Trully Pantow	Tuan Amris	M. Arif Nurmatias	Emeral Stable	1:47.15	
6	11	Zilong Rimboka^{‡}	North Sulawesi	6	Falentino Sangian	Rully Soleran	Natalia Roring	Rimboka Stable	1:47.35	
7	6	Aurora of Khalim	West Java	5	Hanny Suoth	Karlan	Kusnadi Halim	King Halim Stable	1:48.08	
8	7	Suntora Berjaya^{†}	DKI Jakarta	3	Kenny F Ngion	Wahyu Wicaksono	Yuyun Estini	Aisyah Berjaya Stable	1:48.46	
9	8	Milea Guti	West Sumatra	11	Fajar Walangitan	Syafrinal	Wahyu Kurniawan	Guti Stable	1:48.77	
10	5	P. Putra Borneo**	South Kalimantan	8	Risky Rorimpandey	Steven Singal	Sheila Putri Mahardika	BHM Stable	1:49.80	
11	2	Monochrome	North Sulawesi	12	Jones Paendong	Steven Paendong	Nico Kanter	Miranda Stable	1:50.17	
12	12	Cassius Warrior	East Java	2	Bramanto Turangan	Agus Widodo	Bambang K. Istanto	Amigo Stable	1:54.81	
*dh. Raja Bhayangkara; **dh. Virtuoso All Star; ^{†}dh. Suntora Nagari; ^{‡}dh. Sunshield Nagari

==== Mangkunegaran Cup - Results ====
Finish	No	Horse	Contg.	Gate	Weight (kg)	Jockey	Trainer	Owner	Stable	Time	Winnings
1	2	Princess Gavi	West Java	4	52.0	Jemmy Runtu	Karlan	Kusnadi Halim	King Halim Stable	2:09.34	Rp22,500,000
2	3	Prince Patriot	DI Yogyakarta	2	51.0	Trully Pantow	Lili Momuat	Ade Abhideka	Bullion 99 Stable	2:10.64	Rp11,250,000
3	5	Duke BB*	DKI Jakarta	5	52.0	Marcel Singal	Lili Momuat	Andi Ghanna Shafia	Blue Blood Stable	2:10:70	Rp6,250,000
4	4	Yakuza SS	Central Java	3	50.0	Fajar Walangitan	Slamet Pakwo	Abid & Abil	Sheilla Saukia Stable	2:13.73	
DNS	1	Naga Sembilan	DKI Jakarta	1	55.0	Achmad Saefudin	Bagus Haryanto	Ny. Raihana	Red Stone Stable	-	
*dh. Starlight Adara, Padagi NSL, Duke Tonsea

=== Paku Alam Cup 2026 ===
Venue: Sultan Agung Racecourse

Race					Winner					
Order	Classification	Distance	Sponsor	Purse	Horse	Contg.	Jockey	Trainer	Owner	Stable

==== Paku Alam Cup - Results ====
Finish	No	Horse	Contg.	Gate	Jockey	Trainer	Owner	Stable	Time	Winnings
	1									
	2									
	3									
	4									
	5									
	6									
	7									
	8									
	9									
	10									
	11									
	12									

=== 60th Kejurnas Seri I - Indonesia Derby 2026 ===
Venue: Legokjawa Racecourse

Race					Winner					
Order	Classification	Distance	Sponsor	Purse	Horse	Contg.	Jockey	Trainer	Owner	Stable

==== Indonesia Derby - Results ====
Finish	No	Horse	Contg.	Gate	Jockey	Trainer	Owner	Stable	Time	Winnings
	1									
	2									
	3									
	4									
	5									
	6									
	7									
	8									
	9									
	10									
	11									
	12									

=== Indonesia's Horse Racing Cup 2026 ===
Venue: -

Race					Winner					
Order	Classification	Distance	Sponsor	Purse	Horse	Contg.	Jockey	Trainer	Owner	Stable

=== 60th Kejurnas Seri II & PP PORDASI Chairman Cup 2026 ===
Venue: Maesa Tompaso Racecourse

Race					Winner					
Order	Classification	Distance	Sponsor	Purse	Horse	Contg.	Jockey	Trainer	Owner	Stable

==== Super Sprint - Results ====
Finish	No	Horse	Contg.	Gate	Jockey	Trainer	Owner	Stable	Time	Winnings
	1									
	2									
	3									
	4									
	5									
	6									
	7									
	8									
	9									
	10									
	11									
	12									

==== Star of Stars - Results ====
Finish	No	Horse	Contg.	Gate	Jockey	Trainer	Owner	Stable	Time	Winnings
	1									
	2									
	3									
	4									
	5									
	6									
	7									
	8									
	9									
	10									
	11									
	12									

=== King Hamengku Buwono X Cup 2026 ===
Venue: Sultan Agung Racecourse

Race					Winner					
Order	Classification	Distance	Sponsor	Purse	Horse	Contg.	Jockey	Trainer	Owner	Stable

==== King Hamengkubuwono X Cup - Results ====
Finish	No	Horse	Contg.	Gate	Jockey	Trainer	Owner	Stable	Time	Winnings
	1									
	2									
	3									
	4									
	5									
	6									
	7									
	8									
	9									
	10									
	11									
	12									

== Standings ==
PORDASI National Horse Racing Championships
Rank	Contingent	Kejurnas I								Kejurnas II										Grand Total
Rank	Contingent	3yo		2yo		4yo		2yo	3yo+	Open						Sprint				Grand Total
Rank	Contingent	Derby	Juve	A/B	C/D	A/B	C/D	THB		A	B	C	D	E	F	A	B	C	D	Grand Total
1																				
2																				
3																				
4																				
5																				

== Winnings ==
Top 10 highest earning horses 2026
Rank	Horse	Placements			Winnings (Note: May be inaccurate as the division of the purse is not made readily available. It is present in the invitations sent to the owners for each event, but the exact split may vary between event.)	Major race wins
Rank	Horse	1st	2nd	3rd	Winnings	Major race wins
1	Saga Serumpun	2	1	0	Rp87,750,000	Triple Crown II
2	Nara Eclipse	1	1	1	Rp84,750,000	Jateng Derby
3	Fiona of Khalim	2	0	0	Rp81,000,000	Pertiwi Cup
4	Maxi of Khalim	1	0	0	Rp49,500,000	Triple Crown I
5	Kana Eclipse	1	1	0	Rp47,250,000	
6	Naga Sembilan	2	0	0	Rp38,250,000	
7	Princess Gavi	1	2	0	Rp37,125,000	Mangkunegaran Cup
8	Dominator	2	1	0	Rp33,750,000	
9	King Asva	0	1	0	Rp27,000,000	
10	Paco Eclipse	3	0	0	Rp25,875,000	
Updated as of Triple Crown II & Mangkunegaran Cup 2026

== See also ==
- Horse racing in Indonesia
- Indonesia's Horse Racing (horse racing series)
- Indonesia Derby
