= Queen Divona =

Indonesian racehorse

- Breed: G4 (Pordasi classification)
- Sire: Dynamoor Kid
- Grandsire: Dynamoor
- Dam: Poseidina
- Damsire: Long War
- Sex: Mare
- Foaled: August 2, 2019
- Country: Indonesia
- Colour: Bay
- Breeder: King Halim Stable
- Owner: Kusnadi Halim
- Trainer: Karlan
- Jockey: Hanny Suoth; Jemmy Runtu

Major wins
- Star of Stars (2024)

Queen Divona (foaled August 2, 2019 in Pasuruan, East Java) is an Indonesian racehorse and the winner of the 2024 Star of Stars.

== Background ==
Queen Divona is a bay mare foaled on August 2, 2019 at King Halim Stable in Pasuruan, East Java. Her sire is Dynamoor Kid (THB IDN), a son of Dynamoor (THB USA), and her dam is Poseidina (G3), a daughter of Long War (THB USA). Queen Divona breed is defined as G4 according to the Pordasi horse classification and Indonesian studbook.

Queen Divona's owner is Kusnadi Halim, and she is usually ridden by Hanny Suoth.

== Racing career ==
Queen Divona began her racing career in her three-year-old season (2022) by winning first place in the 3YO Debut A/B 1000m class at Tegalwaton. She then took second place at the 2023 Pertiwi Cup. Queen Divona tried her luck by entering the 2023 Indonesia Derby, although she ended up finishing sixth.

Entering her four-year-old season, Queen Divona became a formidable competitor in the Open A class. Her dominance was particularly evident at the Sultan Agung track, where she recorded four additional wins. In 2024, Queen Divona managed to achieve first place in Star of Stars, one of the prestigious races in Indonesia.

Throughout her career, Queen Divona was ridden by two main jockeys: Jemmy Runtu and Hanny Suoth.

Queen Divona represents the province of West Java on Kejurnas.

=== Racing form ===
Date	Racecourse	Race	Class	Distance	Entry	HN	Finished	Time	Jockey	Winner (2nd place)	Ref.
2022 – three-year-old season
Sep 25, 2022	Tegalwaton	Kejurnas Series II	3YO Debut A/B	1000 m	5	3	1st		Jemmy Runtu	(Lucky Eclipse)	
May 21, 2023	Sultan Agung	Pertiwi Cup	3YO fillies	1600 m	8	5	2nd		Jemmy Runtu	(Sunlight Nagari)	
Jul 30, 2023	Kandih	Indonesia Derby	Derby	2000 m	12	6	6th		Jemmy Runtu	Bintang Maja	
2023 – four-year-old season
Sep 3, 2023	Kandih	Star of Stars	Open A	2200 m	10	5	3rd		Hanny Suoth	Queen Thalasa	
Nov 12, 2023	Sultan Agung	Piala Raja Hamengku Buwono X	Open A	2000 m	7	7	2nd		Hanny Suoth	Queen Thalassa	
Jul 28, 2024	Sultan Agung	Kejurnas Series I	4YO A/B	2000 m	3	3	1st		Jemmy Runtu	(Megantara)	
2024 – five-year-old season
Sep 11, 2024	HM Hasan Gayo	2024 Pekan Olahraga Nasional	A	2200 m	8	5	4th		Hanny Suoth	Simpati Nusa	
Nov 17, 2024	Tegalwaton	Star of Stars	Open A	2200 m	5	3	1st		Jemmy Runtu	(Triple's)	
Apr 20, 2025	Sultan Agung	Triple Crown Series I	A Sprint	1300 m	11	11	1st		Hanny Suoth	(Dewa United)	
Jul 27, 2025	Sultan Agung	Kejurnas Series I	Open A	2000 m	5	4	1st		Hanny Suoth	(Triple's)	
2025 – six-year-old season
Okt 19, 2025	Sultan Agung	Star of Stars	Open A	2200 m	5	1	3rd		Hanny Suoth	Naga Sembilan	
Nov 9, 2025	Sultan Agung	Piala Raja Hamengku Buwono X	Open	2000 m	7	4	4th		Hanny Suoth	Triple's	
Feb 15, 2026	Tegalwaton	Jateng Derby	Open	2000 m	10	3	3rd		Jemmy Runtu	Naga Sembilan	
May 10, 2026	Tegalwaton	Piala Raja Mangkunegaran	Sprint Handicap	1300 m	7	4	3rd		Hanny Suoth	War Kudeta	
Jun 14, 2026	Sultan Agung	Piala Raja Paku Alam	Open Handicap	2000 m	7	3	3rd		Jemmy Runtu	Naga Sembilan	
Jul 26, 2026	Legok Jawa	Kejurnas Series I	Open Sprint	1300 m	8	3	2nd		Jemmy Runtu	Prince Patriot	

== Pedigree ==
Pedigree of Queen Divona (IDN), bay filly, 2019
Sire Dynamoor Kid (IDN)	Dynamoor (USA)	Dynaformer (USA)	Roberto (USA)
Sire Dynamoor Kid (IDN)	Dynamoor (USA)	Dynaformer (USA)	Andover Way (USA)
Sire Dynamoor Kid (IDN)	Dynamoor (USA)	Catumbella (USA)	Diesis (GB)
Sire Dynamoor Kid (IDN)	Dynamoor (USA)	Catumbella (USA)	Benguela (USA)
Sire Dynamoor Kid (IDN)	Dark Velvet (IDN)	Darth Vader (AUS)	Buoy (GB)
Sire Dynamoor Kid (IDN)	Dark Velvet (IDN)	Darth Vader (AUS)	Gay Lass (GB)
Sire Dynamoor Kid (IDN)	Dark Velvet (IDN)	Lady Arabella (IDN)	Royal Spartan (AUS)
Sire Dynamoor Kid (IDN)	Dark Velvet (IDN)	Lady Arabella (IDN)	Yoelina (AUS)
Dam Poseidina (IDN) G3	Long War (USA)	Lord At War (ARG)	General (FR)
Dam Poseidina (IDN) G3	Long War (USA)	Lord At War (ARG)	Luna de Miel (ARG)
Dam Poseidina (IDN) G3	Long War (USA)	Lady Windborne (USA)	Secretariat (USA)
Dam Poseidina (IDN) G3	Long War (USA)	Lady Windborne (USA)	Priceless Gem (USA)
Dam Poseidina (IDN) G3	Tsunami (IDN); G2	Blandford Park (USA)	Little Current (IRE)
Dam Poseidina (IDN) G3	Tsunami (IDN); G2	Blandford Park (USA)	Green Finger (IRE)
Dam Poseidina (IDN) G3	Tsunami (IDN); G2	Aigner (IDN); G1	Nan Renceh (AUS)
Dam Poseidina (IDN) G3	Tsunami (IDN); G2	Aigner (IDN); G1	Putri Bancah Lawas (IDN); Local breed
