= Triple's =

Indonesian racehorse

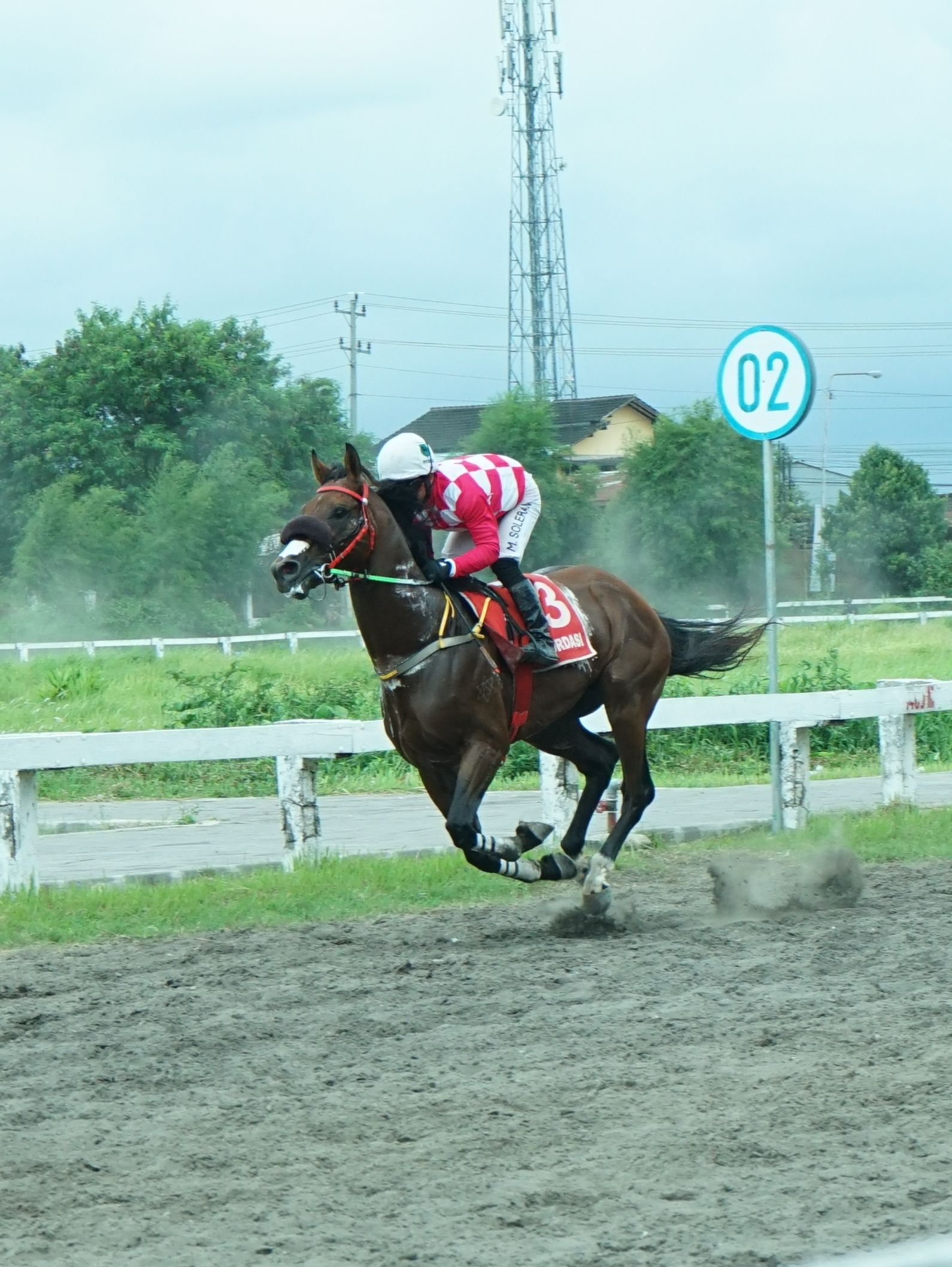
- Triple's at 2025 Piala Raja Hamengku Buwono X
- Breed: G4 (PORDASI classification)
- Sire: Tuscaloosa
- Grandsire: Haayil
- Dam: Vebiola
- Damsire: The Camp
- Sex: Horse
- Foaled: December 19, 2018
- Country: Indonesia
- Colour: Bay
- Breeder: Prima Sion Stable
- Owner: H. Achmad Fitra; Shella Saukia Stable
- Trainer: Slamet Pak Wo
- Jockey: Ended Rahmat; Risky Rorimpandey; Meikel Soleran; E. Rustandi; Achmad Saefudin; E. Tamunu
- Record: 21: 5-8-5

Major wins
- Piala Ketua Umum PP. PORDASI (2024); A.E. Kawilarang Memorial Cup (2024); Piala Raja Hamengku Buwono X (2025)

Triple's (formerly known as Noel Sion, foaled December 19, 2018 in Minahasa, North Sulawesi) is an Indonesian racehorse and the winner of the 2025 Piala Raja Hamengku Buwono X.

== Background ==
Triple's is a bay horse foaled on December 19, 2018 at Minahasa, North Sulawesi by Prima Sion Stable. His sire is Tuscaloosa, a son of Haayil, and his dam is Vebiola, a daughter of The Camp.

Triple's owner is H. Achmad Fitra, and was trained by Slamet Pak Wo. He often ridden by Ended Rahmat and Achamd Saefudin. It has recently been ridden by Meikel Soleran.

== Racing career ==
Triple's started his career with a debut race at Maesa Tompaso, North Sulawesi in 2021. After that, he participated in several regional racing events in both Sulawesi and Sumatra, such as the Piala Pangdam Sulut and the Pacuan Kuda Tradisional Sulut.

Triple's racing career at national from 2024 to 2025 was dominated by middle to long distances (2000m and 2200m). In 11 recorded national race appearances, the horse earned four first-place finishes, five second-place finishes, and two third-place finishes. He frequently faced rivals Queen Thalassa and Queen Divona in races.

His achievements peaked with victories in several prestigious events, such as the Piala Ketua Umum PP PORDASI, the A.E. Kawilarang Memorial Cup, and most recently the King Hamengku Buwono X Cup in November 2025. He frequently changed jockeys; he has been ridden by Ended Rahmat, Achmad Saefudin, and Meikel Soleran.

Triple's represents the province of Central Java on Kejurnas.

=== Racing form ===
Date	Racecourse	Race	Class	Distance	Entry	HN	Finished	Time	Jockey	Winner (2nd place)	Ref.
2021 – two-year-old season
2021	Maesa Tompaso	Latihan Bersama	Debut	800 m			2nd				
2021	Maesa Tompaso	Minahasa Derby					3rd				
2022 – three-year-old season
2022	Maesa Tompaso	Piala Pangdam Sulut					1st				
2022-2023 – four-year-old season
Dec 19, 2022	HM Hasan Gayo	Pacuan Kuda Tradisonal Gayo	A	1400 m			3rd				
Mar 5, 2023	HM Hasan Gayo	Pacuan Kuda Tradisonal Gayo	A	1400 m			2nd				
2023-2024 – five-year-old season
Sep 3, 2023	Kandih	Star of Stars	Open A	2200 m	10	3	6th		Ended Rahmat	Queen Thalasa	
Nov 12, 2023	Sultan Agung	Piala Raja Hamengku Buwono X	Open	2000 m	7	2	3rd		Risky Rorimpandey	Queen Thalasa	
Jan 14, 2024	Tegalwaton	Jateng Derby	A	2000 m	7	4	3rd		Risky Rorimpandey	Queen Thalasa	
Apr 28, 2024	Sultan Agung	Piala Tiga Mahkota Seri I	Open	2000 m		4	2nd		Ended Rahmat	Queen Thalasa	
Jun 2, 2024	Tegalwaton	Piala Tiga Mahkota Seri II	Open	2000 m		2	1st		Ended Rahmat	(Azarya Eclipse)	
2024-2025 – six-year-old season
Sep 11, 2024	HM Hasan Gayo	2024 Pekan Olahraga Nasional	A	2200 m	8	3	3rd		Ended Rahmat	Simpati Nusa	
Nov 17, 2024	Tegalwaton	Star of Stars	Open A	2200 m			2nd		Risky Rorimpandey	Queen Divona	
Dec 15, 2024	Tegalwaton	Piala Ketua Umum PP PORDASI	Open A	2000 m		2	1st		E. Rustandi	(Prince Patriot)	
Jan 12, 2025	Tegalwaton	A.E. Kawilarang Memorial Cup	Open A	2000 m		3	1st		Achmad Saefudin	King of Istana	
Feb 16, 2025	Tegalwaton	Jateng Derby	Open	2000 m		2	2nd		Achmad Saefudin	(King of Istana)	
Jul 27, 2025	Sultan Agung	Kejurnas Series I	Open A	2000 m		3	2nd		E. Tamunu	Queen Divona	
2025-2026 – seven-year-old season
Oct 19, 2025	Sultan Agung	Star of Stars	Open A	2200 m		4	2nd		Achmad Saefudin	Naga Sembilan	
Nov 9, 2025	Sultan Agung	Piala Raja Hamengku Buwono X	Open	2000 m	7	3	1st		Meikel Soleran	(Princess Gavi)	
Feb 15, 2026	Tegalwaton	Jateng Derby	Open	2000 m	10	1	6th		Meikel Soleran	Naga Sembilan	
Apr 4, 2026	Sultan Agung	Triple Crown Series 1 & Pertiwi Cup	Open	2000 m	7	2	4th		Meikel Soleran	Naga Sembilan	
May 10, 2026	Tegalwaton	Piala Raja Mangkunegaran & Triple Crown Series 2	Open Handicap	1300m	7	3	5th		Fajar Walangitan	War Kudeta	
June 14, 2026	Sultan Agung	Piala Raja Paku Alam	Open Handicap	2000 m	7	4	2nd		Angel Manarisip	Naga Sembilan	

== Pedigree ==
Pedigree of Triple's (IDN), bay horse, 2018
Sire Tuscaloosa (NZ)	Haayil (AUS)	Danehill (USA)	Danzig (USA)
Sire Tuscaloosa (NZ)	Haayil (AUS)	Danehill (USA)	Razyana (USA)
Sire Tuscaloosa (NZ)	Haayil (AUS)	Diplomatique (USA)	Biscay (AUS)
Sire Tuscaloosa (NZ)	Haayil (AUS)	Diplomatique (USA)	Fairview Park (NZ)
Sire Tuscaloosa (NZ)	Entrechat Douze (NZ)	Nassipour (USA)	Blushing Groom (FR)
Sire Tuscaloosa (NZ)	Entrechat Douze (NZ)	Nassipour (USA)	Alama (IRE)
Sire Tuscaloosa (NZ)	Entrechat Douze (NZ)	Dancing (NZ)	Danzatore (CAN)
Sire Tuscaloosa (NZ)	Entrechat Douze (NZ)	Dancing (NZ)	Sharon Jane
Dam Vebiola (IDN) G3	The Champ (IDN)	Sabeil (NZ)	Sir Tristram (IRE)
Dam Vebiola (IDN) G3	The Champ (IDN)	Sabeil (NZ)	Wicked Smile (AUS)
Dam Vebiola (IDN) G3	The Champ (IDN)	Golden Honey (IDN)	Darth Vader (AUS)
Dam Vebiola (IDN) G3	The Champ (IDN)	Golden Honey (IDN)	Bundo Kanduang (IDN)
Dam Vebiola (IDN) G3	Bintang Jackelin (IDN); G2	Imaginero (AUS)	Lunchtime (GB)
Dam Vebiola (IDN) G3	Bintang Jackelin (IDN); G2	Imaginero (AUS)	Kadaitcha Girl (AUS)
Dam Vebiola (IDN) G3	Bintang Jackelin (IDN); G2	Putri Lewetan (IDN); G1	Indrajaya (IDN)
Dam Vebiola (IDN) G3	Bintang Jackelin (IDN); G2	Putri Lewetan (IDN); G1	Putri Sherly (IDN); Local breed
