= Djohar Manik =

Indonesian triple-crown winner racehorse

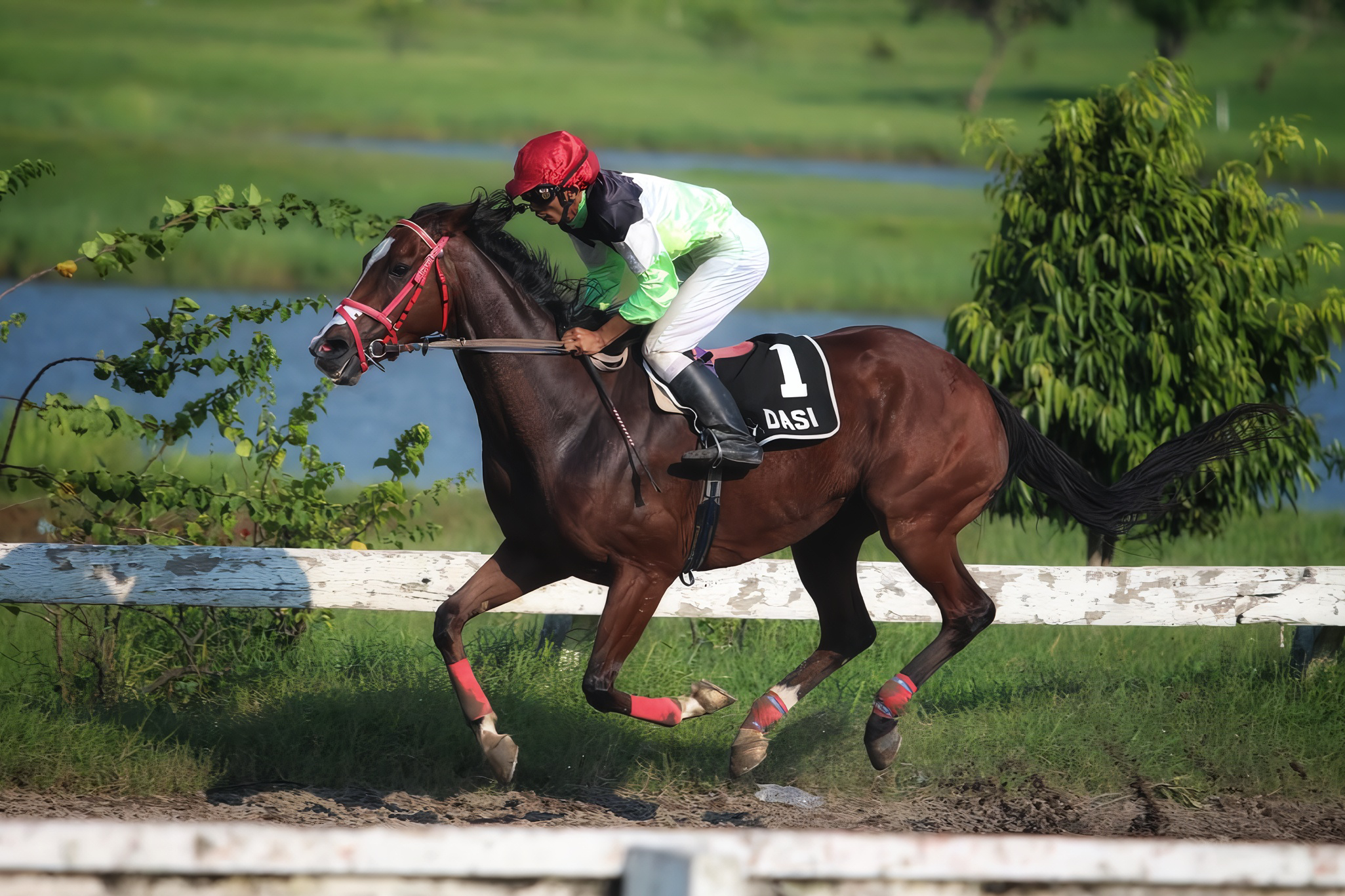
- Djohar Manik ridden by Jendri Turangan in 2016
- Breed: KP5 (Pordasi Classification)
- Sire: Tuscaloosa
- Grandsire: Haayil
- Dam: Mini Satria
- Damsire: Blandford Park
- Sex: Mare
- Foaled: 22 September 2010
- Died: Around September 2024 (aged 14)
- Country: Indonesia
- Colour: Bay (Jragem)
- Breeder: Lala Stable
- Owner: Aragon & Tombo Ati Stable
- Trainer: Edwin Basuki
- Jockey: Jendri Turangan; A. Manarisip
- Record: 43: 35-5-0

Major wins
- Indonesia Derby (2014); Pekan Olahraga Nasional (2016); Kejurnas Star of Stars (2015, 2017, 2018); Kejurnas Super Sprint (2014, 2016)

Awards
- Indonesian Triple Crown (2014); Gold Medal at PON XIX (2016)

Djohar Manik (September 22, 2010 – September 2024) was an Indonesian racehorse who was the third winner of the Indonesian Triple Crown in 2014 after Mystere in 1978 and Manik Trisula in 2002. She won 35 of her 41 races.

== Background ==
Djohar Manik was a bay mare with a white blaze who was bred in Indonesia by Lala Stable. She was foaled in Boyolali on September 22, 2010. Djohar Mnaik was sired by Tuscaloosa, a son of Haayil, out of Mini Satria, a daughter of Blandford Park. She was a descendant of Kentucky Derby winner Northern Dancer through Tuscaloosa.

Munawir, the owner of Djohar Manik, named the horse after Jauhar Manikam of Malay literature, where she is a princess from the Middle East. In an interview, he said to have bought Mini Satria, who was pregnant at that time with Djohar Manik, from Munir Prawoto, an owner of a stable from Boyolali who was soon to be retired. Not long after her birth, her ownership was transferred to Tombo Ati Stable. Djohar Manik was jointly owned by both Aragon and Tombo Ati Stable.

== Racing career ==
In March 2013, Djohar Manik made her debut at Pulomas Racecourse in East Jakarta. At the beginning of the 2014 racing season, during the Jateng Derby, she bolted from the starting gate and ran directly toward her stable, evading capture and forcing her to drop out from the race. She redeemed herself by winning the next appearance at the A.E. Kawilarang Memorial Cup. She later went on to win all three legs of the Indonesian Triple Crown series, becoming the third horse to achieve the title of Indonesian Triple Crown winner.

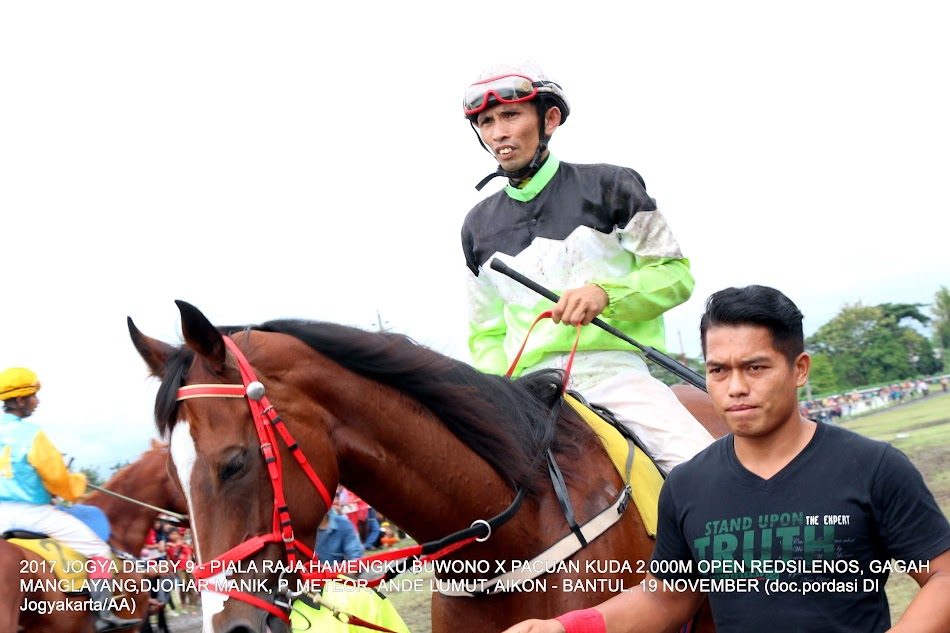
Jendri Turangan and Djohar Manik in 2017 Piala Raja HB X

In addition to her victory at the Indonesian Derby, Djohar Manik is also known to have won three Star of Stars titles (2015, 2017, 2018) and two Super Sprint titles (2014, 2016). In the 2016 Pekan Olahraga Nasional (PON XIX) in West Java, she competed with her jockey, Jendri Turangan, and won the gold medal after finishing first at Legokjawa Racecourse in Pangandaran.

At the 2018 Paku Alam Cup, Jendri Turangan, her senior jockey, suffered an injury prior to the event, and was subsequently replaced by Angel Manarisip. Later that year, the Central Java contingent, of which she was a representative, emerged as the overall winner of the President's Cup (Piala Presiden) during the 2018 Kejurnas Series 2.

=== Racing form ===
In total, Djohar Manik raced 41 races in her career, with 35 wins and 4 places.

Date	Racecourse	Race	Class	Distance	Entry	HN	Finished	Time	Jockey	Winner (Runner-up)	Ref
2013 – Two-year-old season
Mar 10, 2013	Pulomas	Taliabo Derby (2-year-old debut)	Debut A/B	800m	7	1	1st		Jendri Turangan	(Zusi Eclipse)	
May 5, 2013	Pulomas	Minang Derby	2yo Junior A/B	1200m	9	3	1st		Jendri Turangan	(Kartika Jatim)	
Jul 23, 2013	Pulomas	Kejurnas Series 1	2yo Junior A/B	1400m		1	2nd		Jendri Turangan	(Queen Aria)	
2014 – Three-year-old season
Jan 19, 2014	Tegalwaton	Jateng Derby	3yo Derby	1600m	12		DNS		Jendri Turangan	Zusi Eclipse	
Feb 23, 2014	Pulomas	A.E. Kawilarang Memorial	3yo Derby Prospect	1600m	7	1	1st		Jendri Turangan	(Yoker)	
Mar 23, 2014	Pulomas	Tiga Mahkota Series 1	3yo Derby	1200m	10	2	1st		Jendri Turangan	(P Police)	
May 18, 2014	Pulomas	Tiga Mahkota Series 2	3yo Derby	1600m	8	2	1st		Jendri Turangan	(Salido)	
Jun 6, 2014	Pulomas	Indonesia Derby – Elimination	3yo Derby	2000m	10	1	1st		Jendri Turangan	(Queen Aria)	
Jul 20, 2014	Pulomas	Indonesia Derby	3yo Derby	2000m	12	1	1st		Jendri Turangan	(Winona Eclipse)	
Nov 8, 2014	Maesa Tompaso	Super Sprint	Sprint	1300m		1	1st		Jendri Turangan	(Garuda Bintang)	
Mar 8, 2015	Pulomas	Madura Derby	Open	2000m	3	1	1st		Jendri Turangan	(Tuan Nagari)	
Jun 7, 2015	Pulomas	Jakarta Derby	Open	1850m	4	2	1st		Jendri Turangan	(Saud)	
2015 – Four-year-old season
Aug 2, 2015	Pulomas	Kejurnas Series 1	4yo A/B	2000m	3	4	2nd		Jendri Turangan	Winona Eclipse	
Sep 27, 2015	Tegalwaton	Star of Stars	Open	2200m	11	1	1st		Jendri Turangan	(Dealova)	
Jan 31, 2016	Tegalwaton	Jateng Derby	Open	2200m	4	1	2nd		Jendri Turangan	Red Silenos	
Mar 27, 2016	Pulomas	Tiga Mahkota Series 1	Open	2200m	3	1	1st		Jendri Turangan	(P Bintang Timur)	
May 22, 2016	Pulomas	Minang Derby	Open	2200m	4	2	2nd		Jendri Turangan	Red Silenos	
Aug 7, 2016	Tegalwaton	Kejurnas Series 1	Open	2000m	4	1	1st		Jendri Turangan	(Mata Nagari)	
Sep 16, 2016	Legokjawa	Pekan Olahraga Nasional – Elimination	Open	1300m	9		2nd		Jendri Turangan	Tirtajaya	
Sep 28, 2016	Legokjawa	Pekan Olahraga Nasional XIX	Open	1300m	11	2	1st		Jendri Turangan	(Voodoo)	
Nov 27, 2016	Tegalwaton	Super Sprint	Sprint	1300m	5	5	1st		Jendri Turangan	(Voodoo)	
Feb 19, 2017	Tegalwaton	Jateng Derby	Open	2000m	7	1	1st		Jendri Turangan	(Xena Eclipse)	
Apr 16, 2017	Tegalwaton	Pertiwi Cup	Open	2200m	5	2	1st		Jendri Turangan	(P Bintang Timur)	
Jul 30, 2017	Tegalwaton	Indonesia Derby	Open	2200m	7	1	1st		Jendri Turangan	King Savero	
Oct 22, 2017	Ki Ageng Astrojoyo	Star of Stars	Open	2200m	7	2	1st		Jendri Turangan	(Red Silenos)	
Nov 19, 2017	Sultan Agung	Piala Raja HB X	Open	2000m	6	3	1st		Jendri Turangan	(Red Silenos)	
Jan 28, 2018	Tegalwaton	A.E. Kawilarang Memorial Cup	Sprint	1300m	6	5	1st		Jendri Turangan	(Xena Eclipse)	
Feb 25, 2018	Tegalwaton	Jateng Derby	Open	2000m	5	3	1st		Jendri Turangan	(Red Silenos)	
Jun 24, 2018	Sultan Agung	Pakualam Cup	Open	2000m			1st		Angel Manarisip	(Ratu Kemilau)	
Jul 29, 2018	Tegalwaton	Kejurnas Series 1	Open	2200m	7	1	1st		Angel Manarisip	(Dragon Runner)	
Oct 14, 2018	Tegalwaton	Sumpah Pemuda Cup	Open	2000m	4	3	1st		Angel Manarisip		
Dec 22, 2018	Maesa Tompaso	Star of Stars	Open	2200m	9	1	1st		Angel Manarisip	(Lauretta Eclipse)	
Feb 27, 2019	Tegalwaton	Jateng Derby	Open	2000m	6	6	6th		Angel Manarisip		
Marc 17, 2019	Tegalwaton	Tiga Mahkota Series 1	Open	2000m	3	2	1st		Angel Manarisip	(Lady Aria)	
May 26, 2019	Tegalwaton	Tiga Mahkota Series 2	Open	2200m	5	2	1st		Angel Manarisip	(Lady Aria)	
Jun 22, 2019	Sultan Agung	Pakualam Cup	Open	2000m	3	3	1st		Angel Manarisip	(Kamang Chrome)	
Jul 28, 2019	Tegalwaton	Kejurnas Series 1	Open	2200m	6	1	4th		Angel Manarisip	Kamang Chrome	

== Retirement and death ==
She retired in 2019.

In 2024 Djohar Manik died due to laminitis while she was pregnant with a foal by a stud named Leonardo Eclipse.

== Pedigree ==
Pedigree of Djohar Manik (IDN), bay mare, 2010
Sire Tuscaloosa (NZ)	Haayil (AUS)	Danehill (USA	Danzig (USA)
Sire Tuscaloosa (NZ)	Haayil (AUS)	Danehill (USA	Razyana (USA)
Sire Tuscaloosa (NZ)	Haayil (AUS)	Diplomatique (AUS)	Biscay (AUS)
Sire Tuscaloosa (NZ)	Haayil (AUS)	Diplomatique (AUS)	Fairview Park (NZ)
Sire Tuscaloosa (NZ)	Entrechat Douze (NZ)	Nassipour (USA)	Blushing Groom (FR)
Sire Tuscaloosa (NZ)	Entrechat Douze (NZ)	Nassipour (USA)	Alama (IRE)
Sire Tuscaloosa (NZ)	Entrechat Douze (NZ)	Dancing (NZ)	Danzatore (CAN)
Sire Tuscaloosa (NZ)	Entrechat Douze (NZ)	Dancing (NZ)	Sharon Jane (NZ)
Dam Mini Satria (IDN)	Blandford Park (USA)	Little Current (USA)	Sea Bird II (FR)
Dam Mini Satria (IDN)	Blandford Park (USA)	Little Current (USA)	Luiana (USA)
Dam Mini Satria (IDN)	Blandford Park (USA)	Green Finger (USA)	Better Self (USA)
Dam Mini Satria (IDN)	Blandford Park (USA)	Green Finger (USA)	Flower Bed (USA)
Dam Mini Satria (IDN)	Let's Ivor (IDN)	Young Ivor (AUS)	Ivor Prince (USA)
Dam Mini Satria (IDN)	Let's Ivor (IDN)	Young Ivor (AUS)	Al-di-la (AUS)
Dam Mini Satria (IDN)	Let's Ivor (IDN)	Ledia (IDN)	Allegretto (IDN)
Dam Mini Satria (IDN)	Let's Ivor (IDN)	Ledia (IDN)	Leny Kiki (IDN)
