= Princess Gavi =

Indonesian racehorse

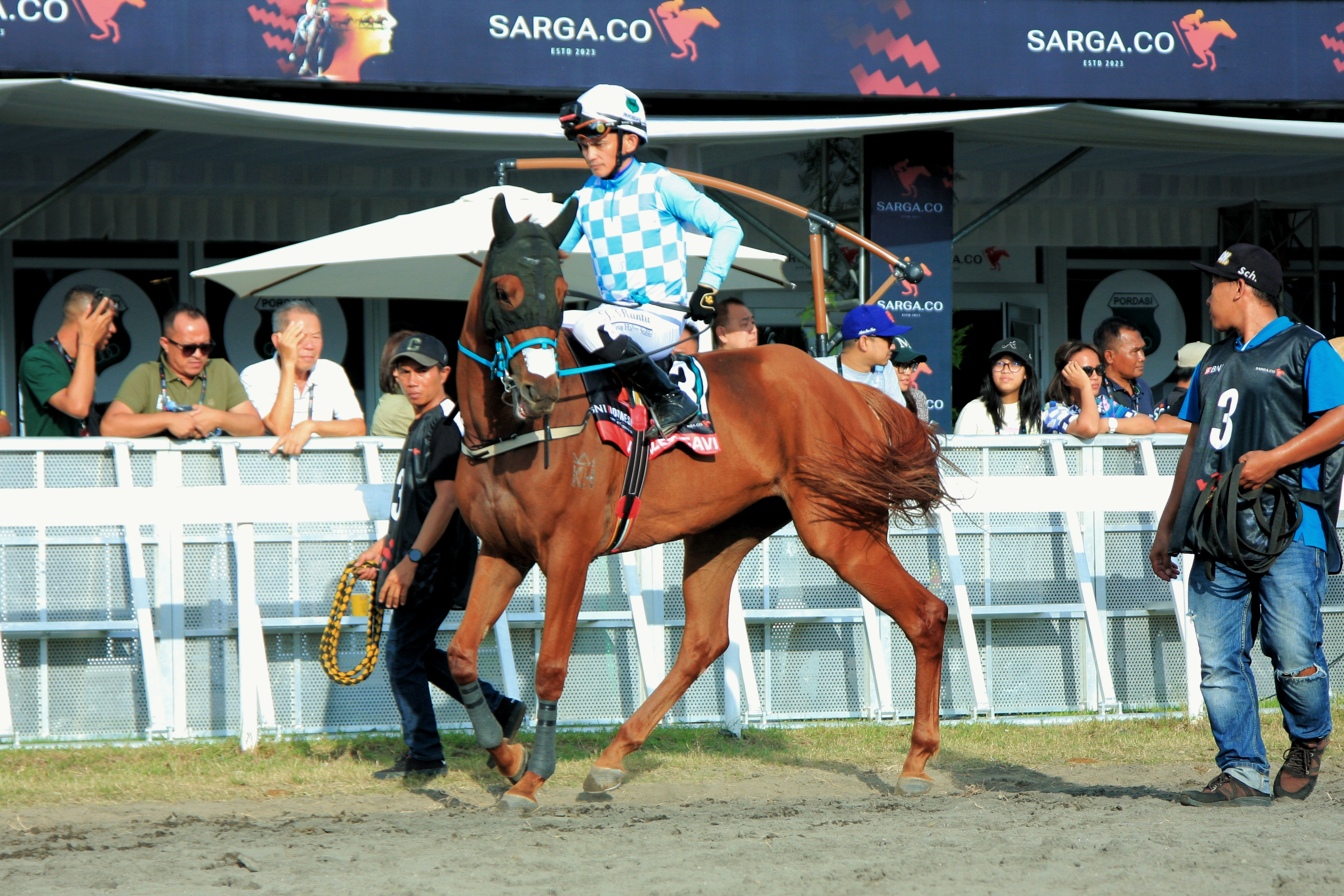
- Princess Gavi at 2025 Pertiwi Cup
- Breed: KP6 (Pordasi classification)
- Sire: Agrippa
- Grandsire: Almuinjjid
- Dam: Queen Jasmine
- Damsire: Long War
- Sex: Filly
- Foaled: October 1, 2021
- Country: Indonesia
- Colour: Chestnut (Napas)
- Breeder: King Halim Stable
- Owner: Kusnadi Halim
- Trainer: Karlan; Farooq Ali Khan
- Jockey: Hanny Suoth; Ahmad Fauzi; Jemmy Runtu
- Record: 12: 6-2-0

Major wins
- Piala Ketum PP Pordasi 2024–2028 (2024); Pertiwi Cup (2025); Super Sprint (2025); Piala Raja Mangkunegaran (2026)

Princess Gavi (foaled October 1, 2021 in Pasuruan, East Java) is an Indonesian racehorse and the winner of the Pertiwi Cup 2025 and Super Sprint 2025.

== Background ==
Princess Gavi is a chestnut filly foaled on October 1, 2021 at King Halim Stable in Pasuruan, East Java. Her sire is Agrippa, a son of Almuinjjid, and her dam is Queen Jasmine, a daughter of Long War.

Princess Gavi's owner is Kusnadi Halim, and she is usually ridden by Jemmy Runtu and Hanny Suoth. She stands at 158 cm.

== Racing career ==
Princess Gavi made her debut on June 2, 2024, at Tegalwaton in the Triple Crown Series 1. She won first place in the 800-meter race under jockey Hanny Suoth.

In her race in the Indonesia Derby 2024, her jockey, Jemmy Runtu, fell right after the gate opened. Despite this, Princess Gavi continued to finish first, though her victory was disallowed.

Entering the racing season as a 3-year-old, Princess Gavi demonstrated her dominance by securing four consecutive wins, including the Piala Ketua Umum PP Pordasi 2024–2028 (1400 m), A.E. Kawilarang Memorial Cup 2025 (1400 m), Jateng Derby 2025 (1400 m), and Pertiwi Cup 2025 (1600 m).

In the Indonesia Derby on July 20, 2025, Princess Gavi finished second in the 2000-meter race, behind King Argentin.

On 19 October 2025, she won the Kejurnas Super Sprint 2025, and in this race confused the judges because Princess Gavi and Dominator dh. King Talago finish together in a dead heat. The judges re-analyzed the race and decided that Princess Gavi was the winner.

=== Racing form ===
The data below is mostly based on information available on livestreams from the YouTube channel and website of Sarga. Co, the main company that organizes and manages professional horseracing tournaments in Indonesia.

Date	Racecourse	Race	Class	Distance	Entry	HN	Finished	Time	Jockey	Winner (2nd place)	Ref.
2024 – two-year-old season
Jan 14, 2024	Tegalwaton	Jateng Derby	2yo Debut A/B	800m	7	2	5th		Hanny Suoth	Caraxes Nagari	
Jun 2, 2024	Tegalwaton	Triple Crown Series 1	2yo Junior C/D	800m	8	7	1st		Hanny Suoth	(Kamaka Eclipse)	
Jul 28, 2024	Sultan Agung	Indonesia Derby	2yo Junior A/B	1200m	12	1	– (Note: Princess Gavi crossed the finish line first but was disqualified after her jockey fell.)		Jemmy Runtu	Mayaloosa	
2024 – three-year-old season
Dec 15, 2024	Sultan Agung	Piala Ketua Umum PP Pordasi 2024–2028	3yo Juvenile Div. I	1400m	10	2	1st		Ahmad Fauzi	(Mayaloosa)	
Jan 12, 2025	Tegalwaton	A.E Kawilarang Memorial Cup	3yo Juvenile	1400m	5	1	1st		Jemmy Runtu	(Caraxes Nagari)	
Feb 16, 2025	Tegalwaton	Jateng Derby	3yo Juvenile Div I	1400m	12	1	1st		Jemmy Runtu	(Wulan Nuangan)	
Apr 20, 2025	Sultan Agung	Pertiwi Cup	3yo fillies	1600m	8	3	1st		Jemmy Runtu	(Naura Ayu)	
Jul 20, 2025	Sultan Agung	Indonesia Derby	Derby	2000m	12	1	2nd		Hanny Suoth	King Argentin	
2025 – four-year-old season
Oct 19, 2025	Sultan Agung	Super Sprint	Open	1300m	7	1	1st		Hanny Suoth	(Dominator dh. King Talago)	
Nov 9, 2025	Sultan Agung	Piala Raja Hamengku Buwono X	Open	2000m	7	1	2nd		Jemmy Runtu	Triple's	
Feb 15, 2026	Tegalwaton	Jateng Derby	Open Sprint	1300m	12	10	2nd		Hanny Suoth	Dominator dh. King Talago	
Apr 4, 2026	Sultan Agung	Triple Crown Series 1 & Pertiwi Cup	Open	2000m	7	3	2nd		Hanny Suoth	Naga Sembilan dh. Leonidas	
May 10, 2026	Tegalwaton	Piala Raja Mangkunegaran	Open Handicap	2000 m	5	2	1st		Jemmy Runtu	(Prince Patriot)	

== Pedigree ==
Pedigree of Princess Gavi (IDN), Chestnut filly, 2021
Sire Agrippa (IDN)	Almuinjjid (USA)	Blushing Groom (FR)	Red God (USA)
Sire Agrippa (IDN)	Almuinjjid (USA)	Blushing Groom (FR)	Runaway Bride (GB)
Sire Agrippa (IDN)	Almuinjjid (USA)	Herb Wine (USA)	Full Pocket (USA)
Sire Agrippa (IDN)	Almuinjjid (USA)	Herb Wine (USA)	Harbor Wine (USA)
Sire Agrippa (IDN)	Balmerini (AUS)	Balmerniro (NZ)	Balmerino (NZ)
Sire Agrippa (IDN)	Balmerini (AUS)	Balmerniro (NZ)	Coprissia (NZ)
Sire Agrippa (IDN)	Balmerini (AUS)	Donna's Beach (AUS)	Brigand (USA)
Sire Agrippa (IDN)	Balmerini (AUS)	Donna's Beach (AUS)	Donaletta (USA)
Dam Queen Jasmine (IDN)	Long War (USA)	Lord At War (ARG)	General (FR)
Dam Queen Jasmine (IDN)	Long War (USA)	Lord At War (ARG)	Luna del Miel (ARG)
Dam Queen Jasmine (IDN)	Long War (USA)	Lady Winborne (USA)	Secretariat (USA)
Dam Queen Jasmine (IDN)	Long War (USA)	Lady Winborne (USA)	Priceless Gem (USA)
Dam Queen Jasmine (IDN)	Noni Agis (IDN)	Cal Harbor (USA)	Forty Niner (USA)
Dam Queen Jasmine (IDN)	Noni Agis (IDN)	Cal Harbor (USA)	Balinese (USA)
Dam Queen Jasmine (IDN)	Noni Agis (IDN)	Fygi (IDN)	Adi Negara (AUS)
Dam Queen Jasmine (IDN)	Noni Agis (IDN)	Fygi (IDN)	Heli Star (IDN)

== See also ==
- Horse racing in Indonesia
