= Rapid Dash =

Indonesian racehorse

- Breed: G4 (PORDASI classification)
- Sire: Dynamoor Kid
- Grandsire: Dynamoor
- Dam: Queen Emirate
- Damsire: Long War
- Sex: Colt
- Foaled: 3 October 2020
- Country: Indonesia
- Colour: Chestnut (napas)
- Breeder: King Halim Stable
- Owner: Slamet Husni; King Halim Stable; Blue Ocean Stable
- Trainer: Karlan
- Jockey: Jemmy Runtu; Marcel Singal

Major wins
- Indonesia Derby (2024)

Rapid Dash (foaled October 3, 2020 in Pasuruan, East Java) is an Indonesian racehorse. His major win at national race was in the 2024 Indonesia Derby.

== Background ==
Rapid Dash is a chestnut colt foaled on October 3, 2020, at King Halim Stable in Pasuruan, East Java. His sire is Dynamoor Kid (THB), a son of Dynamoor (THB), and his dam is Queen Emirate (G3), a daughter of Long War (THB). Rapid Dash breed is classified as G4 (Generasi ke-4) based on the Pordasi classification, with a proportion of Thoroughbred genetic material more than 87.5%.

Rapid Dash is owned by Blue Ocean Stable, but management related to his racing is handled by King Halim Stable. He is currently trained by Karlanridden by Jemmy Runtu and Marcel Singal.

== Racing career ==
On 2023, Rapid Dash made his debut in the Piala Tiga Mahkota Seri II Debut A/B class at Sultan Agung Racecourse and immediately won first place in the 1000 meters with jockey Jemmy Runtu. His performance continued on 2024, in the prestigious Indonesia Derby, where Rapid Dash again performed impressively, finishing in first place, still with Jemmy Runtu in the 2000 meters. Entering the 2025 season, Rapid Dash participated in the Indonesia's Horse Racing Cup Open A class on June 15, 2025 with jockey Marcel Signal, but finished sixth in the 2000 meters.

=== Racing form ===
| Date | Racecourse | Race | Class | Distance | Entry | HN | Finished | Time | Jockey | Winner (2nd place) | Ref. |
|---|---|---|---|---|---|---|---|---|---|---|---|
| May 21, 2023 | Sultan Agung | Piala Tiga Mahkota Seri II | Debut A/B | 1000m | | | 1st | | Jemmy Runtu | (Ardiaa Satu) | |
| Jul 28, 2024 | Sultan Agung | Kejurnas Series 1 (Indonesia Derby) | Derby | 2000m | 12 | 2 | 1st | | Jemmy Runtu | (Naga Sembilan) | |
| June 15, 2025 | Sultan Agung | Indonesia’s Horse Racing Cup | Open A | 2000m | 7 | 7 | 6th | | Marcel Singal | Naga Sembilan | |

== Pedigree ==
Pedigree of Rapid Dash (IDN), chestnut colt, foaled 2020
| Sire Dynamoor Kid (IDN) | Dynamoor (USA) | Dynaformer (USA) | Roberto (USA) |
| Sire Dynamoor Kid (IDN) | Dynamoor (USA) | Dynaformer (USA) | Andoverway (USA) |
| Sire Dynamoor Kid (IDN) | Dynamoor (USA) | Catumbella (USA) | Diesis (GB) |
| Sire Dynamoor Kid (IDN) | Dynamoor (USA) | Catumbella (USA) | Banguela (USA) |
| Sire Dynamoor Kid (IDN) | Dark Velvet (IDN) | Darth Vader (AUS) | Buoy (GB) |
| Sire Dynamoor Kid (IDN) | Dark Velvet (IDN) | Darth Vader (AUS) | Gay Lass (GB) |
| Sire Dynamoor Kid (IDN) | Dark Velvet (IDN) | Lady Arabella (IDN) | Royal Spartan (AUS) |
| Sire Dynamoor Kid (IDN) | Dark Velvet (IDN) | Lady Arabella (IDN) | Yoelina |
| Dam Queen Emirate (IDN) | Long War (USA) | Lord At War (ARG) | General (FR) |
| Dam Queen Emirate (IDN) | Long War (USA) | Lord At War (ARG) | Luna De Miel (ARG) |
| Dam Queen Emirate (IDN) | Long War (USA) | Lady Winborne (USA) | Secretariat (USA) |
| Dam Queen Emirate (IDN) | Long War (USA) | Lady Winborne (USA) | Priceless Gem (USA) |
| Dam Queen Emirate (IDN) | Dinasty Star (IDN) | Putra Pinabetengan (AUS) | Lefroy (NZ) |
| Dam Queen Emirate (IDN) | Dinasty Star (IDN) | Putra Pinabetengan (AUS) | Baballon Maid |
| Dam Queen Emirate (IDN) | Dinasty Star (IDN) | Swindy (IDN) | Titov (IDN) |
| Dam Queen Emirate (IDN) | Dinasty Star (IDN) | Swindy (IDN) | Tondey (IDN) |
