= Milord (horse) =

Indonesian racehorse (2022–2025)

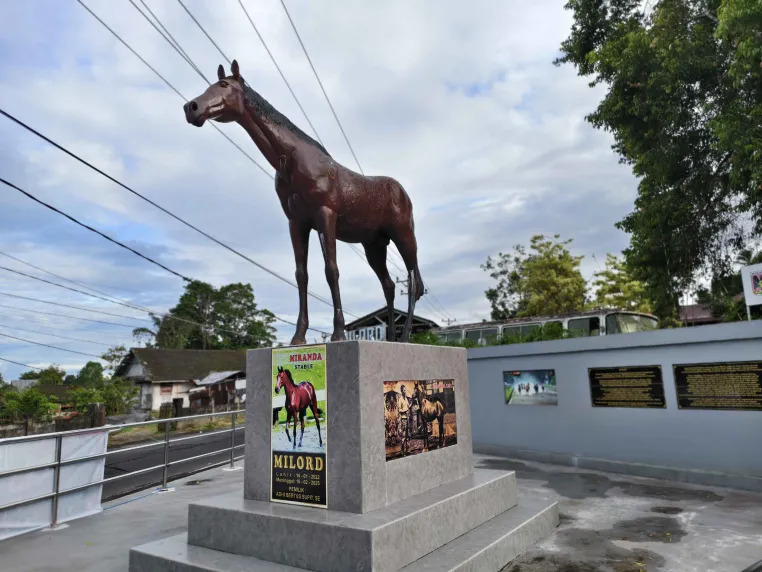
- Statue of Milord in West Tompaso, 2026
- Breed: KP5 (Pordasi classification)
- Sire: Da Vinci Eclipse
- Grandsire: Red Giant
- Dam: Fitri Nagari
- Damsire: Swift John
- Sex: Stallion
- Foaled: 16 January 2022
- Died: 16 February 2025
- Country: Indonesia
- Colour: Bay (Merah)
- Breeder: Bendang Stable
- Owner: Adhi Bertus Supit; (Miranda Stable)
- Trainer: Steven Paendong
- Jockey: Jones Paendong
- Record: 7: 4-2-0
- Last updated on October 11, 2025

Milord (January 16, 2022 – February 16, 2025) was an Indonesian racehorse.

== Background ==
Milord was a bay horse who was bred in Indonesia by Bendang Stable. He was foaled on January 16, 2022, in Pinabetengan, West Tompaso, Minahasa Regency, North Sulawesi. He was sired by Da Vinci Eclipse out of Fitri Nagari. Through his damsire Red Giant, he was a descendant of Kingmambo.

Despite his relatively small stature, Milord gained popularity in North Sulawesi, where he was regarded as the region's favorite racehorse and a potential contender for the next Triple Crown winner. However, he was involved in a mid-race collision with another horse at the Jateng Derby, before the start of the Triple Crown series, and died shortly afterward.

According to Pordasi's classification of racehorse breeds, he is a KP5 breed horse, meaning that he is the 5th generation of crossbreeding between a Thoroughbred and a local horse. His short height of around 153 cm classified him within the C/D class in competitions.

== Racing career ==
He was transferred to the ownership of Miranda Stable on August 2, 2023. Milord made his debut at the Maesa Tompaso Racecourse, Minahasa Regency on January 27, 2024.

Milord was known for his rivalry with King Argentin, with whom he fought twice, even beating him at the 2024 Pordasi Chairman's Cup (Indonesian: Piala Ketum PP Pordasi). Other than that, he also raced alongside Kamaka Eclipse, fighting against him four times in both series of the 2024 Tiga Mahkota and Kejurnas races.

Though his stature was smaller compared to the other racehorses he raced with, his achievements in competitions gained him popularity and appreciation from the people of North Sulawesi, eventually earning him the title of "North Sulawesi's Flagship Racehorse" and "The Little Challenger".

=== Untimely death at Jateng Derby ===
In the 2025 Jateng Derby, Milord was involved in a fatal racing incident with another contender from West Sumatra, Salvator Minang. This happened at the 18th race, a 1,600-meter event for three-year-old derby horses at Tegalwaton Racecourse, Semarang Regency, Central Java. The race featured potential contenders for the Indonesian Triple Crown series, like King Argentin and Wonder Land.

Earlier in the race, Salvator Minang's jockey, Yanni Rondonuwu, was thrown from the saddle at the first corner, leaving the horse running uncontrollably. Milord led the field by about two lengths over Wonder Land after the backstretch. But as all eyes were laid on Milord as he enters the final spurt, he collided head-on with Salvator Minang, who had turned and was running in the opposite direction. The impact threw Milord's jockey, Jones Paendong, from the saddle.

Both Milord and Salvator Minang died shortly afterward, while the jockeys had to be taken to hospital to receive intensive care. Following the tragedy, organizers declared the 3-year-old derby 1,600-meter division race void and divided the prize equally among the eleven participants. Many horse racing fans from North Sulawesi expressed regret and sadness over the incident.

=== Racing records ===
The data below are mostly based on information available on YouTube.

Date	Racecourse	Race	Class	Distance	Entry	HN	Finished	Jockey	Winner (2nd place)	Ref
2024 – two-year-old season
Jan 27, 2024	Tompaso	2-year-old debut	2yo Debut	800m	4	1	1st	Jones Paendong	(Lady Aurora)	
Apr 28. 2024	Sultan Agung	Tiga Mahkota Series 1	2yo Junior C/D	1000m	12	12	2nd	Jones Paendong	Caraxes Nagari	
Jun 2, 2024	Tegalwaton	Tiga Mahkota Series 2	2yo Junior C/D	1000m	12	1	1st	Jones Paendong	(Putra Barbara)	
Jul 28, 2024	Sultan Agung	58th Kejurnas Series 1	2yo Junior C/D	1200m	12	2	2nd	Jones Paendong	Mayaloosa	
2024 – three-year-old season
Nov 17, 2024	Tegalwaton	58th Kejurnas Series 2	3yo Juvenile	1200m	12	1	1st	Jones Paendong	(Kamaka Eclipse)	
Dec 15, 2024	Tegalwaton	Piala Ketum PP Pordasi 2024–2028	3yo Derby div. I	1600m	9	5	1st	Jones Paendong	(King Argentin)	
Feb 16, 2025	Tegalwaton	Jateng Derby	3yo Derby Prospect	1600m	11	2	DNF	Jones Paendong	King Argentin (Note: Race declared void)	

== Legacy ==
On March 1, almost a month after the tragedy, a regional horse racing competition known as the Milord Memorial Cup was held in his memory.

Later, on June 5, 2025, a monument dedicated to him was also erected in his hometown of West Tompaso. The monument was unveiled by Minahasa Regent Robby Dondokambey and Vice Regent Vanda Sarundajang. A picture of Milord, a short biography, as well as the words "Farewell, Milord. Your fighting spirit and dedication will always be an inspiration, a boost to morale, and a patriotic spirit" are engraved on the pedestal.

== Pedigree ==
Pedigree of Milord, bay horse, foaled January 16, 2022 in West Tompaso, Indonesia
Sire Da Vinci Eclipse (NZ)	Red Giant (USA)	Giant's Causeway (USA)	Storm Cat (USA)
Sire Da Vinci Eclipse (NZ)	Red Giant (USA)	Giant's Causeway (USA)	Mariah's Storm (USA)
Sire Da Vinci Eclipse (NZ)	Red Giant (USA)	Beyond The Sun (USA)	Kingmambo (USA)
Sire Da Vinci Eclipse (NZ)	Red Giant (USA)	Beyond The Sun (USA)	Carnet Solaire (USA)
Sire Da Vinci Eclipse (NZ)	Danwood (AUS)	Woodman (USA)	Mr. Prospector
Sire Da Vinci Eclipse (NZ)	Danwood (AUS)	Woodman (USA)	Playmate (USA)
Sire Da Vinci Eclipse (NZ)	Danwood (AUS)	Dansino (AUS)	Danehill (USA)
Sire Da Vinci Eclipse (NZ)	Danwood (AUS)	Dansino (AUS)	Leica Western (AUS)
Dam Fitri Nagari (IDN)	Swift John (AUS)	Alzao (USA)	Lyphard (USA)
Dam Fitri Nagari (IDN)	Swift John (AUS)	Alzao (USA)	Lady Rebecca (GB)
Dam Fitri Nagari (IDN)	Swift John (AUS)	Satin Doll (FR)	Kenmare (FR)
Dam Fitri Nagari (IDN)	Swift John (AUS)	Satin Doll (FR)	Marie de Solesmes (FR)
Dam Fitri Nagari (IDN)	Rubine (IDN)	Lord Lichen (AUS)	Twig Moss (FR)
Dam Fitri Nagari (IDN)	Rubine (IDN)	Lord Lichen (AUS)	Pharalee (FR)
Dam Fitri Nagari (IDN)	Rubine (IDN)	Kemala Dewi (IDN)	Just Splendid (AUS)
Dam Fitri Nagari (IDN)	Rubine (IDN)	Kemala Dewi (IDN)	Laswi (IDN)

== Notes ==
1. Indonesian: Kuda Andalan Sulawesi Utara/Sulut
2. Indonesian: Si Penantang Kecil
3. Original: "Selamat jalan MILORD. Semangat juang dan dedikasimu akan selalu menjadi inspirasi, penambah semangat serta jiwa patriotik"

== See also ==
- Horse racing in Indonesia
