= Naga Sembilan =

Indonesian racehorse (foaled 2020)

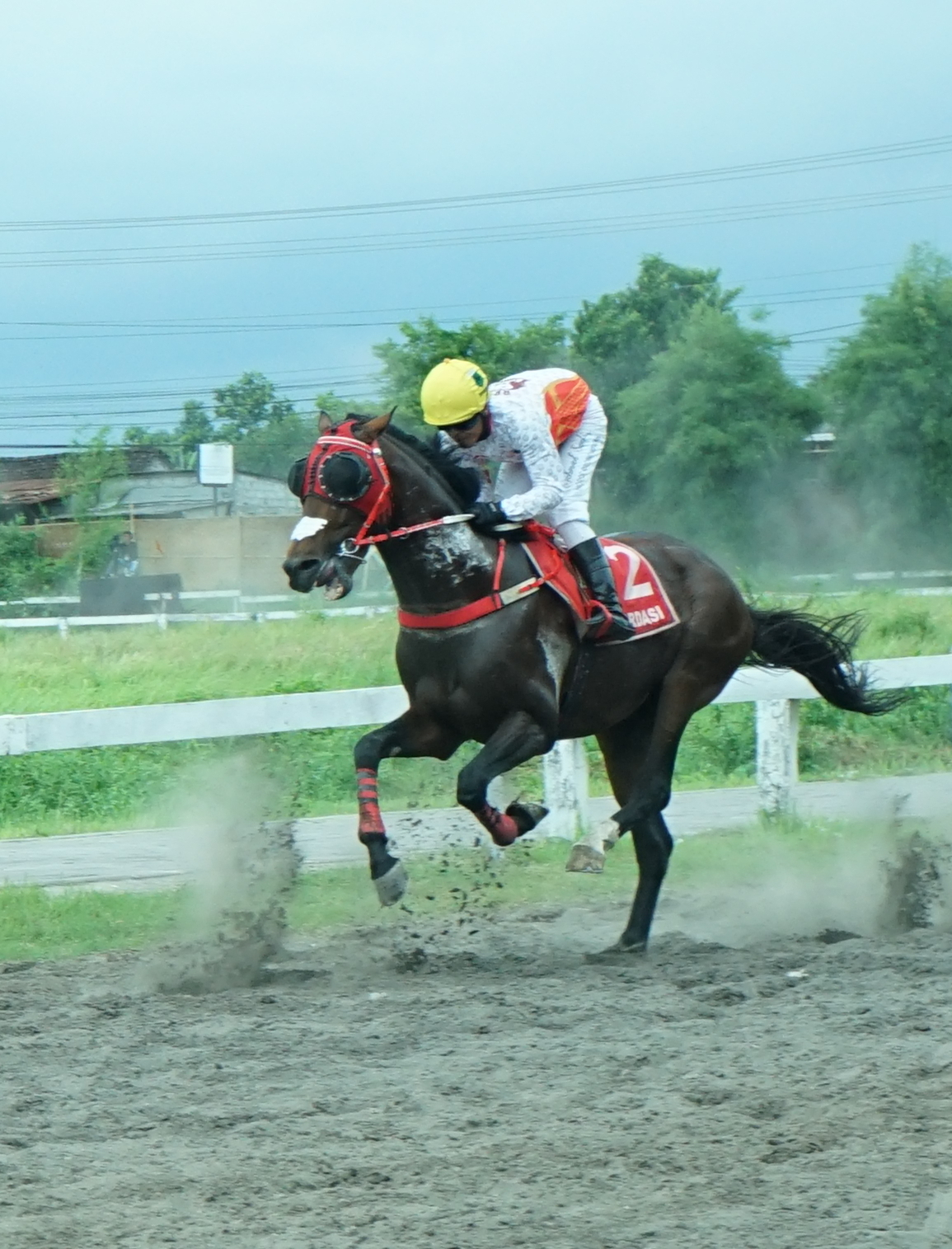
- Naga Sembilan at the Hamengkubuwono X Cup (2025)
- Breed: KP7 (Pordasi classification)
- Sire: Da Vinci Eclipse
- Grandsire: Red Giant
- Dam: Marior Sia
- Damsire: Rajo Biaro
- Sex: Horse
- Foaled: August 31, 2020
- Country: Indonesia
- Colour: Bay (Jragem)
- Breeder: Miranda Stable
- Owner: Irfan Karaeng Makka; H. Munir; Raihana Bagus
- Trainer: Jori Lampus; Bagus Haryanto
- Jockey: Aji Ardiansyah; Achmad Saefudin
- Record: 11: 7-3-1

Major wins
- Piala Raja Hamengku Buwono X (2024); Star of Stars (2025)
- Last updated on November 7, 2025

Naga Sembilan (Note: Officially written as Naga Sembilan dh. Leonidas.) (formerly known as Leonidas, foaled August 31, 2020 in Manado, North Sulawesi) is an Indonesian racehorse and the winner of the Star of Stars, the feature race of the Kejurnas Series II in 2025.

== Background ==
Naga Sembilan is a bay horse, foaled on August 31, 2020 at Miranda Stable in Manado, North Sulawesi. His sire is Da Vinci Eclipse, a son of world record holder Red Giant, and his dam is Marrior Sia, a daughter of Rajo Biaro.

Irfan Karaeng Makka purchased Naga Sembilan at 4 months old from Miranda Stable. He then registered his horse under the name "Leonidas". For two years, Leonidas was raised at Al Attar Stable located in Jeneponto, South Sulawesi. According to Irfan, the name "Leonidas" is a reference to Leonidas I, the Spartan king who fought thousands of enemies and defended his kingdom.

In 2022, Irfan sold Leonidas to Pasir Mas Stable (East Java), and he was renamed to Naga Sembilan. Naga Sembilan was then sold to Red Stone Stable (Jakarta) in 2025. The name Naga Sembilan, translating to "Nine Dragons" in English, is said to be a reference to the nine hair swirls the horse has.

Naga Sembilan's current owner is Ny. Raihana Bagus, and he is usually ridden by Achmad Saefudin.He is measured at 161cm.

== Racing career ==
Following multiple transfers of ownership throughout his career, he competed under different provincial contingents. In 2023, he represented South Sulawesi under his previous name, Leonidas, at the A.E. Kawilarang Memorial Cup. At the 2024 Pekan Olahraga Nasional, he represented East Java. In the 2025 Kejurnas Series II, he represented Jakarta.

=== Racing form ===
The data below are mostly based on information available on livestreams from the YouTube channel and website of Sarga. Co, the promoter and event organizer for races on the national level.

Date	Racecourse	Race	Class	Distance	Entry	HN	Finished	Time	Jockey	Winner (Runner-up)	Ref.
2023 – two-year-old season
Feb 02, 2023	Tegalwaton	A. E. Kawilarang Memorial Cup	Beginner A/B	1200 m		1	1st		Marcel Singal	(Debora Eclipse)	
May 21, 2023	Sultan Agung	Tiga Mahkota Series 2	Beginner A/B	1200 m		1	3rd		Marcel Singal	Clarion All Star	
2023 – three-year-old season
Nov 12, 2023	Sultan Agung	Piala Raja Hamengku Buwono X	Derby A/B	1500 m			1st		Aji Ardiansyah	(Debora Eclipse)	
Jul 28, 2024	Sultan Agung	Indonesia Derby	Derby	2000 m		1	2nd		Aji Ardiansyah	Rapid Dash	
2024 – four-year-old season
Oct 12, 2024	HM Hasan Gayo	PON XXI Aceh-Sumut 2024	B	1850 m		4	2nd		Aji Ardiansyah	Bintang Maja	
Dec 15, 2024	Sultan Agung	Piala Raja Hamengku Buwono X	Open	2000 m		1	1st		Aji Ardiansyah	(P. Bintang Kalsel)	
May 18, 2025	Tegalwaton	Triple Crown Serie 2	Open A	2000 m		2	2nd		Nandang Septian	King of Istana	
Jun 15, 2025	Sultan Agung	Indonesia’s Horse Racing Cup	Open A	2000 m		3	1st		Achmad Saefudin	(Guti Spirit)	
Jul 27, 2025	Sultan Agung	Kejurnas Series I	4YO A/B	2000 m		1	1st		Achmad Saefudin	(King of Istana)	
2025 – five-year-old season
Oct 19, 2025	Sultan Agung	Star of Stars	Open A	2200 m	5	2	1st		Achmad Saefudin	(Triple's)	
Nov 09, 2025	Sultan Agung	Piala Raja Hamengku Buwono X	Open	2000 m	7	2	3rd		Achmad Saefudin	Triple's	
Feb 15, 2026	Tegalwaton	Jateng Derby	Open	2000 m	10	2	1st		Achmad Saefudin	(Romantic Spartan)	
April 4, 2026	Sultan Agung	Triple Crown Series 1 & Pertiwi Cup	Open	2000 m	7	5	1st		Achmad Saefudin	(Princess Gavi)	
May 10, 2026	Tegalwaton	Piala Raja Mangkunegaran	Open Handicap	2000 m	5	1	SCR (Note: Naga Sembilan refused to enter the starting gate and was scratched for exceeding the time limit given.)				
June 14, 2026	Sultan Agung	Piala Raja Paku Alam	Open Handicap	2000 m	7	1	1st		Achmad Saefudin	(Triple's)	

== Pedigree ==
Pedigree of Naga Sembilan (IDN), bay horse, 2020
Sire Da Vinci Eclipse (NZ)	Red Giant (USA)	Giant's Causeway (USA)	Storm Cat (USA)
Sire Da Vinci Eclipse (NZ)	Red Giant (USA)	Giant's Causeway (USA)	Mariah's Storm (USA)
Sire Da Vinci Eclipse (NZ)	Red Giant (USA)	Beyond The Sun (USA)	Kingmambo* (USA)
Sire Da Vinci Eclipse (NZ)	Red Giant (USA)	Beyond The Sun (USA)	Carnet Solaire (USA)
Sire Da Vinci Eclipse (NZ)	Danwood (AUS)	Woodman (USA)	Mr. Prospector* (USA)
Sire Da Vinci Eclipse (NZ)	Danwood (AUS)	Woodman (USA)	Playmate (USA)
Sire Da Vinci Eclipse (NZ)	Danwood (AUS)	Dansino (AUS)	Danehill** (USA)
Sire Da Vinci Eclipse (NZ)	Danwood (AUS)	Dansino (AUS)	Leica Western (AUS)
Dam Marior Sia (IDN)	Rajo Biaro (AUS)	Desert King (IRE)	Danehill** (USA)
Dam Marior Sia (IDN)	Rajo Biaro (AUS)	Desert King (IRE)	Sabaah (USA)
Dam Marior Sia (IDN)	Rajo Biaro (AUS)	Cedar (AUS)	Last Tycoon (IRE)
Dam Marior Sia (IDN)	Rajo Biaro (AUS)	Cedar (AUS)	Amber Aly (USA)
Dam Marior Sia (IDN)	Gadis Agam Sumbar (IDN)	Voting Dancer (AUS)	Voting (AUS)
Dam Marior Sia (IDN)	Gadis Agam Sumbar (IDN)	Voting Dancer (AUS)	Nina Bonita (NZ)
Dam Marior Sia (IDN)	Gadis Agam Sumbar (IDN)	Princess Adyat (IDN)	Encounter Bay (AUS)
Dam Marior Sia (IDN)	Gadis Agam Sumbar (IDN)	Princess Adyat (IDN)	Ratu Adyat (IDN)

* Naga Sembilan is inbred 5S x 4S to the stallion Mr. Prospector, meaning he appears in the fifth generation (via Kingmambo) and the fourth generation of his pedigree on his sire's side.

** Naga Sembilan is inbred 4S x 4D to the stallion Danehill, meaning he appears in the fourth generation of both his sire and dam's side of his pedigree.

== See also ==
- Horse racing in Indonesia
