= Damayanti (horse) =

Indonesian racehorse

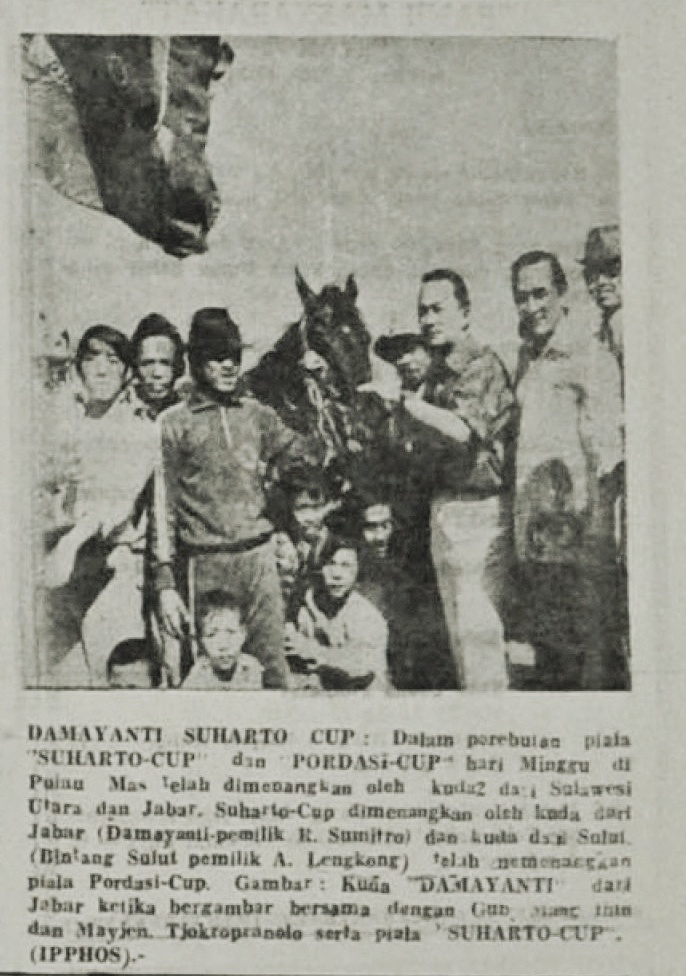
- Newspaper excerpt on Damayanti winning the Soeharto Cup (Indonesia Derby), 1973
- Breed: Priangan
- Sire: Dark Chevallier
- Dam: Banapati
- Sex: Mare
- Foaled: 13 February 1968
- Country: Indonesia
- Colour: Bay (Jragem)
- Breeder: Stal Cimahi
- Owner: R. Sumitra

Major wins
- Soeharto Cup (1972, 1973, 1974); HUT DKI Jaya (1974); Piala Pulomas (1974); Srikandi Cup (1975)

Damayanti (also known as Darmajanti, foaled February 13, 1968 in West Java) was an Indonesian racehorse. Her major wins includes the 1972, 1973, and 1974 Soeharto Cup.

== Background ==
Damayanti was a bay Priangan mare foaled on February 13, 1968 at Stal Cimahi in West Java. Her sire is Dark Chevallier and her dam is Banapati.

Damayanti's owner was R. Sumitra.

== Racing career ==
Damayanti was a racehorse belonging to the West Java contingent who actively competed from 1972 to 1975.

Damayanti was one of Indonesia's leading racehorses in the early 1970s, boasting outstanding achievements in various major events. Her fame began at the 1972 Kejurnas VII, where she finished second in the preliminary round before rebounding to win the final of Kejurnas VII, defeating Primadona with a time of 1:35.1 seconds. She then completed her victory in the Soeharto Cup (Indonesia Derby).

Her consistency continued at the Kejurnas VIII in 1973, when Damayanti successfully won the preliminary round as well as the main class, and again appeared dominant by winning the Soeharto Cup in the same year, defeating Primadona.

In 1974, Damayanti added to her trophy haul with a victory at the HUT DKI Jaya, followed by success at the Kejurnas XI and the Soeharto Cup. Other accomplishments include victories in the Pulomas Cup and the Srikandi Cup in 1975.

Damayanti ended her racing career with a win on November 12, 1975 at Arcamanik.

=== Racing form ===
Date	Racecourse	Race/Class	Distance	Entry	HN	Finished	Time	Jockey	Winner (Runner-up)
1972 – two-year-old season
23 April 1972	Pulomas	Poni KL 1	1200 m			1st	1:22.0		(—)
29 July 1972	Tegalega	KL A	1400 m			1st	1:39.8		(Mutiara)
30 July 1972	Tegalega	KL A	1600 m			1st	1:58.7		(Marcopolo)
1972 – three-year-old season
22 Nov 1972	Pulomas	Kejurnas VII (elimination)	1400 m			2nd	1:36.3		Primadona
24 Nov 1972	Pulomas	Kejurnas VII (final)	1400 m			1st	1:35.1		(Primadona)
25 Nov 1972	Pulomas	Kejurnas VII – Soeharto Cup	1600 m			1st	1:34.1		(Primadona)
8 July 1973	Pulomas	Poni KL 1	600 m			1st	0:40		(—)
20 July 1973	Pulomas	Kejurnas VIII (elimination)	1400 m			1st	1:31.5		(Primadona)
20 July 1973	Pulomas	Kejurnas VIII KL A	1400 m			1st	1:32.3		(Primadona)
22 July 1973	Pulomas	Soeharto Cup	1600 m			1st	1:49.4		(Primadona)
16 June 1974	Pulomas	HUT DKI Jaya	1400 m			1st	1:33.5		(Puspita)
1974 – four-year-old season
4 Oct 1974	Manado	Kejurnas IX KL A	1400 m			1st	—		(Fauna)
4 Oct 1974	Manado	Soeharto Cup	1600 m			1st	—		(—)
29 Dec 1974	Pulomas	Piala Pulomas Poni KL A	1200 m			1st	1:21.0		(Jimmy)
16 Feb 1975	Pulomas	Srikandi Cup	1200 m			1st	—		(Puspita)
12 Nov 1975	Arcamanik	KL A	1400 m			1st	1:41.0		(—)
