= Star of Stars =

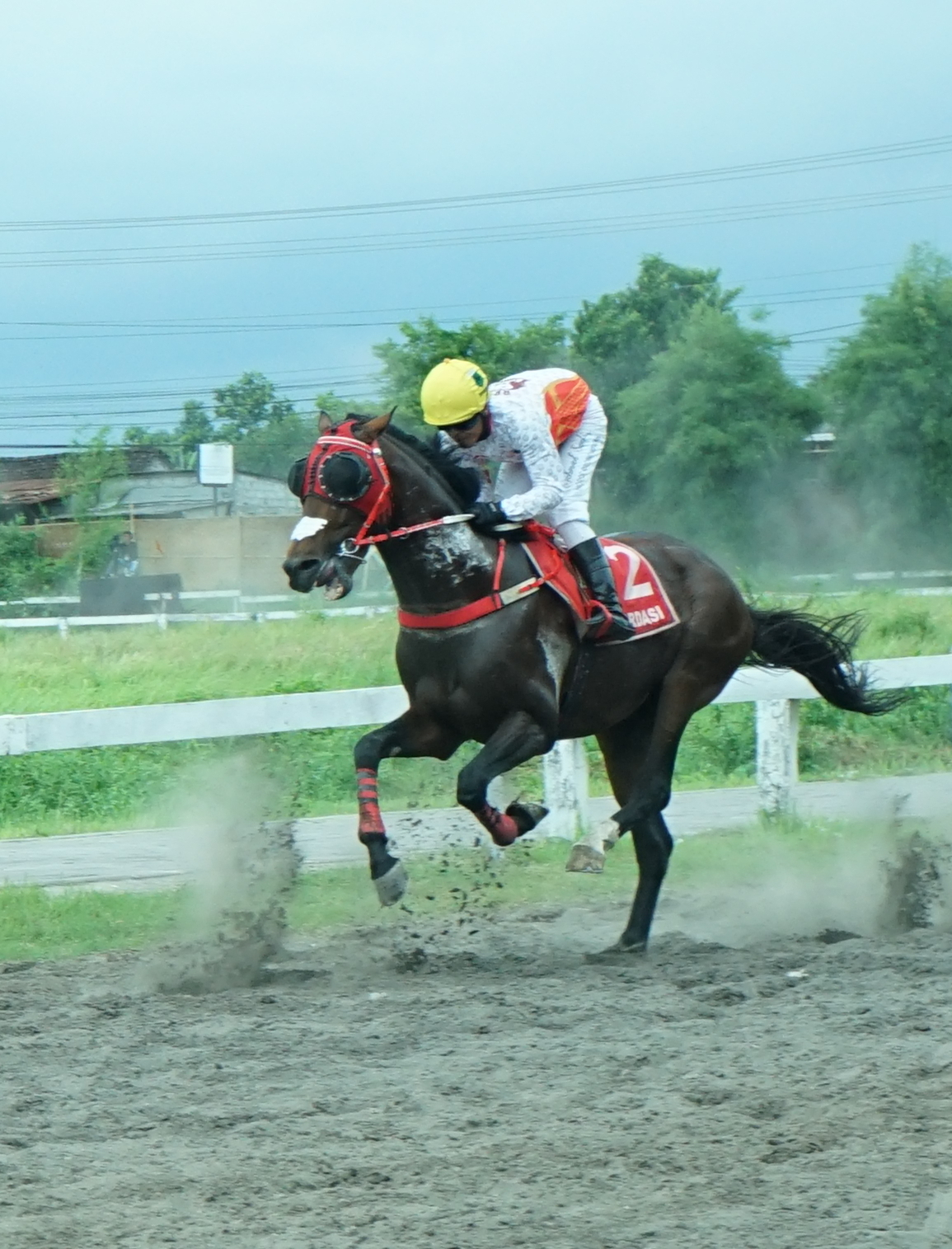
- 2025 Star of Stars winner Naga Sembilan (pictured here in the 2025 HBX Cup)
- Location: Changes yearly
- Inaugurated: 1966 (Soeharto Cup); 1975
- Race type: Flat racing
- Website: sarga.co

Race information
- Distance: 2200 meters
- Surface: Dirt
- Track: Right-handed
- Qualification: G/KP/Kuda Pacu Indonesia; 3-y-o & up, Class A (height ≥ 161,1cm)
- Purse: Rp70,000,000 (2025); 1st: Rp35,000,000; 2nd: Rp10,500,000; 3rd: Rp7,000,000; 4th: Rp3,500,000; 5th: Rp1,750,000

The Kejurnas series Open Class A race, today known as the Star of Stars, is a flat horse race in Indonesia for Class A (≥161.1cm) horses aged three and above and is run over a distance of 2,200 meters (approximately 1^{3}/_{8} miles). The race is part of the second leg of the Kejurnas series (National Championships), and is usually held in October along with the Super Sprint. It is known as the "highest stage" for horse racing in Indonesia after the Indonesia Derby.

As with most horse races in Indonesia, thoroughred horses are not allowed to compete. Only crossbreeds (called G/KP) and Kuda Pacu Indonesia with a height of 161,1cm or greater are allowed to race.

== History ==
=== Soeharto Cup (1966–1974) ===
The Star of Stars, as the Open Class A race of the Kejurnas series, can be traced back to the first National Championships in 1966. Back then the annual National Chamionship was a single race, with the winner of the race obtaining the Soeharto Cup. The 1966 edition was the first official national-level horse race held by PORDASI, and it was held after PORDASI was recognized by the government as the sole parent organization for equestrian sports in Indonesia, with Suharto as its patron. The first winner of the Soeharto Cup was Diana, who was owned by Suharto himself.

The one race format of the Soeharto Cup only lasted up until 1974. In the first six years of its existence, the Soeharto Cup was held at various different venues across Bogor, Magelang, Manado, and Bandung, before settling at Jakarta after the completion of the Pulomas Racecourse. The most successful racehorses of the pre-1975 Soeharto Cup were Damayanti with three wins and Primadona with two.

=== Kejurnas series Open Class A race (1975–now) ===
In 1975, the National Championships format was changed from one race to multiple races of different classifications. Since then, the Soeharto Cup was won by the most successful provincial contingent in two legs of the National Championships. The first leg being the Indonesia Derby, and the second features several races classified by height.

The main race of the second leg of the Kejurnas series was the Open Class A race, which, for most of the New Order era, was named the Ahmad Yani Memorial Cup. The first to win the cup was Damayanti, who had won the last three Soeharto Cups. After the fall of Soeharto, the race went under several different names before being named the Star of Stars during the 2010s.

The length for the race changed over time. It was set to 1600m from its inauguration until the 1990s. In 1989, sprint races were introduced to the National Championships. The new Class A Sprint race was 1200m, and today is called the Super Sprint and has a length of 1300m. In the 90s, the Open Class A was extended to 2000m before being extended once more in 1999 to 2200m, as it stands today.

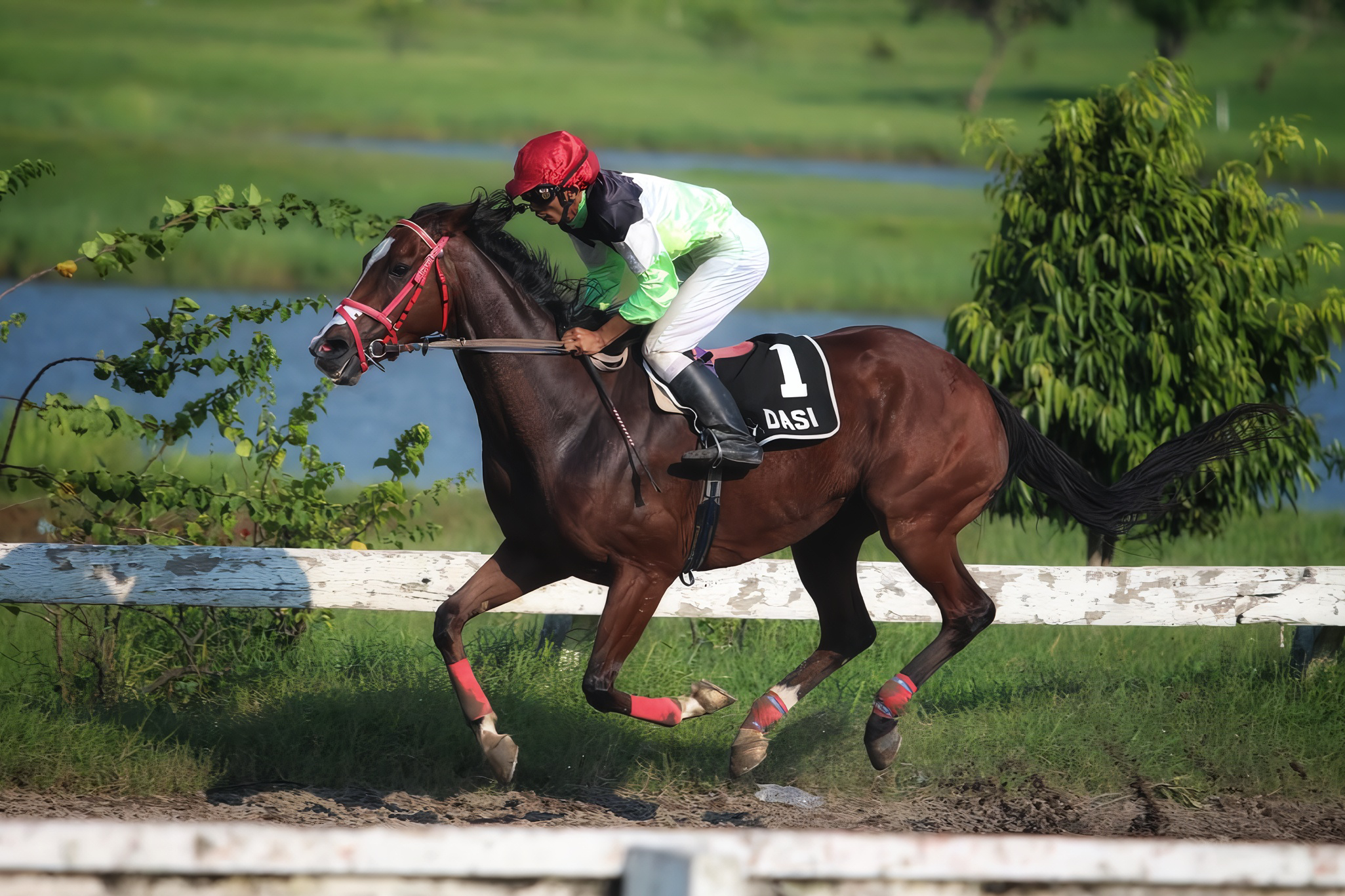
Djohar Manik, winner of Star of Stars in 2015, 2017, and 2018

Saud is the most successful horse in this race, with five consecutive victories from 2010 to 2014. The record is followed by Djohar Manik and Surya Baskara, with three wins each. If 1966–1974 Soeharto Cup wins were counted as well, then Damayanti is the second most successful, with four consecutive wins from 1972 to 1975.

== Records ==
Leading horses

- 5 – Saud (2010, 2011, 2012, 2013, 2014)
- 4 – Damayanti (Soeharto Cup 1972, 1973, 1974) (1975)
- 3 – Djohar Manik (2015, 2017, 2018)
- 3 – Surya Baskara (2001, 2002, 2003)
- 2 – Primadona (Soeharto Cup 1970, 1971)
- 2 – Liberty (1985, 1986)
- 2 – Galigo (1988, 1989)
- 2 – Kusuma Bangsa (1989, 2000)
- 2 – Queen Thalassa (2021, 2023)

Most wins by a jockey

- 7 – Jendri Turangan (2010, 2011, 2012, 2013, 2014, 2015, 2017)
- 4 – W. Mewengkang (1981, 1982, 1985, 1986)
- 4 – Jemmy Runtu (2009, 2021, 2023, 2024)

Most wins by a trainer

- 5 – Berty Sondakh (2010, 2011, 2012, 2013, 2014)
- 4 – E. Basuki (1975, 1983, 1987, 1988)
- 3 – Karlan (2021, 2023, 2024)

Most wins by an owner

- 5 – Bagelan Stable (2010, 2011, 2012, 2013, 2014)
- 5 – Aragon Stable (2007, 2015, 2016, 2017, 2018)
- 4 – Pamulang Stud & Stable (2001, 2002, 2003, 2004)
- 3 – Tombo Ati Stable (2015, 2017, 2018)
- 3 – King Halim Stable (2021, 2023, 2024)

== Winners ==
=== Soeharto Cup ===
Year	Winner	Jockey	Trainer	Owner(s)	Distance
1966	Diana			Soeharto	1200m
1967	Little King			Soemitra	1200m
1968	Bintang Kakanda			Manembu	1200m
1969	Kawanua			B. Supit	1200m
1970	Primadona			A.C.J. Mantiri	1200m
1971	Primadona			Hein Victor Worang	1200m
1972	Damayanti			Soemitra	1200m
1973	Damayanti			Soemitra	1200m
1974	Damayanti			Soemitra	1200m

=== Kejurnas series Open Class A race ===
Year	Winner	Jockey	Trainer	Owner(s)	Length
1975	Damayanti	Sambas	Edwin Basuki	R. Soemitra	1600m
1998	Not held				
1977	Caudello	A. Rumimper	-	G. A. Siwu	1600m
1978	Brilliant	Royke Sondak	Martin Supit	Harry Soebagio	1600m
1979	Trisula	J. Roring	M. Supit	Brilliant Stable	1600m
1980	Mona Mia	J. Roring	R. Lumintang	Maharani Stable	1600m
1981	Bryan	Welly Mewengkang	-	Harry Soebagio	1600m
1982	Leonardo	Welly Mewengkang	-	G. A. Siwu	1600m
1983	Palupi	Coen Singal	Edwin Basuki	Prayitno/Sukun Stable	1600m
1984	Mawar Melati	J. Sumuweng	A. Lanujaya	R. S. Natalegawa	1600m
1985	Liberty	Welly Mewengkang	E. Darusman	Stal Liberty	1600m
1986	Liberty	Welly Mewengkang	-	Liberty Stable	1600m
1987	Atilla	R. Pantouw	Edwin Basuki	Prajitno/Sukun Stable	1600m
1988	Galigo	Coen Singal	Edwin Basuki	Ahmad Rizal	1600m
1989	Galigo	Coen Singal	Dr. Ahmad Rizal	Dr. Ahmad Rizal	1600m
1990	?				
1991	?				
1992	?				
1993	?				
1994	?				
1995	?				
1996	Robin Hood	-	Wahono AT	Ir. Jeane	2000m
1997	Zippo	-	-	Felix	2000m
1998	Cancelled				
1999	Kusuma Bangsa	-	-	Tommy Wuisang	2200m
2000	Kusuma Bangsa	-	-	Tommy Wuisang	2200m
2001	Surya Baskara	-	-	Pamulang Stud & Stable	2200m
2002	Surya Baskara	-	-	Pamulang Stud & Stable	2200m
2003	Surya Baskara	-	-	Pamulang Stud & Stable	2200m
2004	Bayu Taruna	-	-	Pamulang Stud & Stable	2200m
2005	Lady Borjuise	-	-	-	2200m
2006	Exotica	-	-	Agam Tirto Buwono	2200m
2007	Star Show	E. Sonitan	Iwan Kurniawan	Aragon Stable	2200m
2008	Bintang Klabat	F. Nayoan	Tonny Rumambi	Olly Dondokambey	2200m
2009	Poseidon	J. Runtu	Eddy Wowiling	Cheng Kwok Kwai	2200m
2010	Saud	J. Turangan	Berty Sondakh	Ir. Kristianto S. (Bagelen Stable)	2200m
2011	Saud	J. Turangan	Berty Sondakh	Ir. Kristianto S. (Bagelen Stable)	2200m
2012	Saud	J. Turangan	Berty Sondakh	Ir. Kristianto S. (Bagelen Stable)	2200m
2013	Saud	J. Turangan	Berty Sondakh	Ir. Kristianto S. (Bagelen Stable)	2200m
2014	Saud	J. Turangan	Berty Sondakh	Ir. Kristianto S. (Bagelen Stable)	2200m
2015	Djohar Manik	J. Turangan	Edwin Basuki	Aragon & Tombo Ati Stable	2200m
2016	Red Silenos	D. Suhendar	Iwan Kurniawan	Karina & Karisa Saddak (Aragon Stable)	2200m
2017	Djohar Manik	J. Turangan	Edwin Basuki	Aragon & Tombo Ati Stable	2200m
2018	Djohar Manik	A. Manarisip	J. Turangan	Aragon & Tombo Ati Stable	2200m
2019	Manguni Makasiouw	H. Paendong	H. Roring	Manguni Makasiouw Stable	2200m
2020	Cancelled due to COVID-19 pandemic				
2021	Queen Thalassa	J. Runtu	Karlan	King Halim Stable	2200m
2022	Lyana Nagari	F. Sangian	Mario Bahar	Bendang Stable	2200m
2023	Queen Thalassa	J. Runtu	Karlan	King Halim Stable	2200m
2024	Queen Divona	J. Runtu	Karlan	King Halim Stable	2200m
2025	Naga Sembilan	Achmad Saefudin	Bagus haryanto	Ny. Raihana Bagus (Red Stone Stable)	2200m
