= Pertiwi Cup (horse race) =

Pertiwi Cup Indonesian Oaks
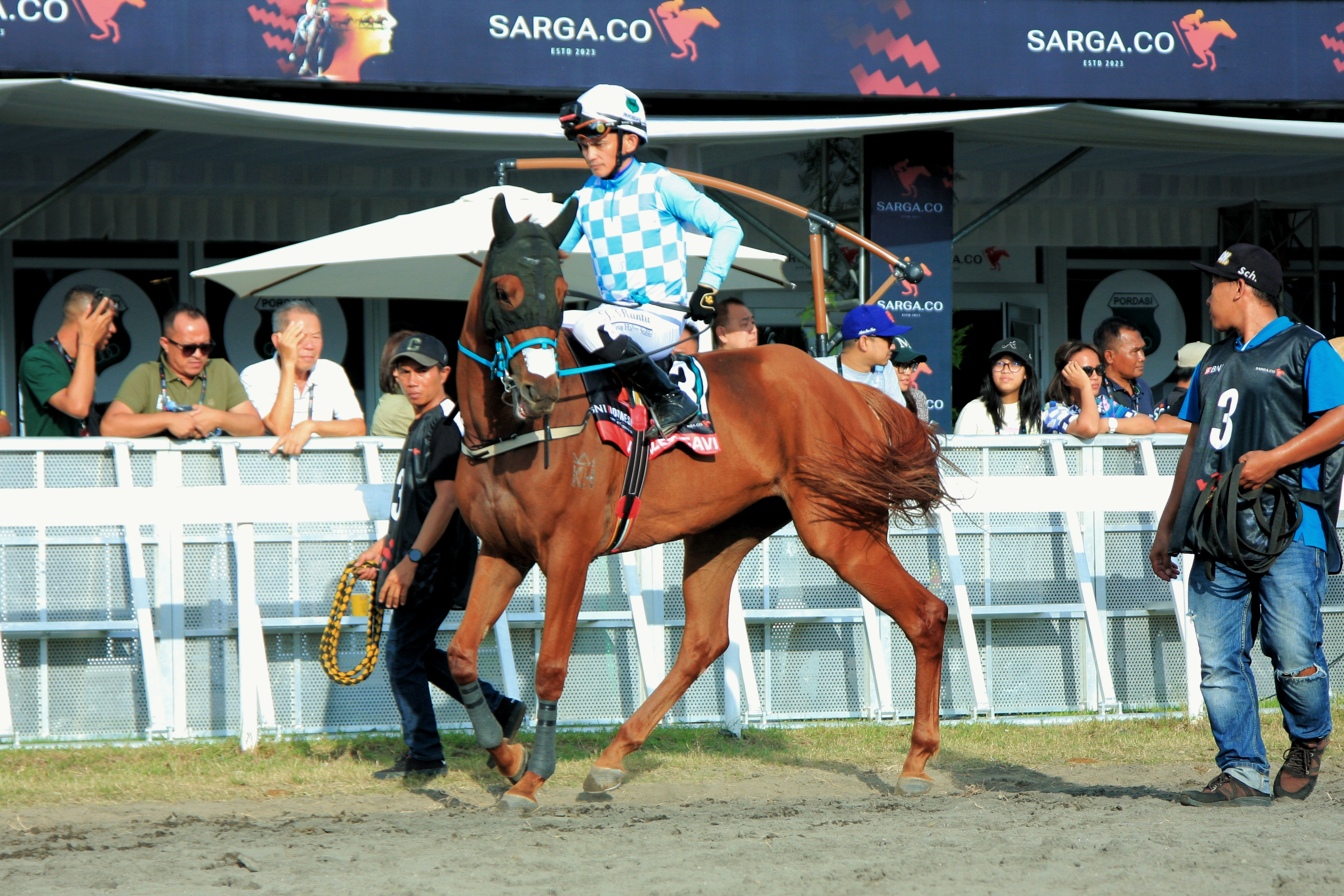
- 2025 Pertiwi Cup winner Princess Gavi
- Location: Changes yearly
- Inaugurated: 1980
- Race type: G/KP/Kuda Pacu Indonesia; Flat racing
- Website: sarga.co

Race information
- Distance: 1,600 meters
- Surface: Dirt
- Track: Right-handed
- Qualification: 3-y-o, Fillies
- Purse: Rp200,000,000 (2025); 1st: Rp80,000,000; 2nd: Rp50,000,000; 3rd: Rp30,000,000

The Pertiwi Cup, also known as the Indonesian Oaks, is a flat horse race in Indonesia for three-year-old fillies run over a distance of 1,600 meters (approximately 1 mile), usually held in April as a form of respect for RA Kartini, an Indonesian women's emancipation figure who was born in that month. As with the Derby, this race can only be participated in by G/KP horses (crossbred horses with Thoroughbreds) and Kuda Pacu Indonesia.

The Pertiwi Cup is held in conjunction with the first leg of the Indonesian Triple Crown. Pertiwi Cup is part of the Indonesian classic race.

== History ==
The Pertiwi Cup was first held in 1980 at Pulomas, running over a distance of 1,300 m and any age. The winner was Sengeti, a G1 mare from Pamulang Stud & Stable.

In 1987, the distance was extended to 1400 m. In 1992, the rules were changed to allow only three-year-old fillies to compete. In 1996, the distance was extended again to 1600 m, where it remains today.

== Winners since 1980 ==
Year	Winner	Jockey	Trainer	Owner(s)	Time
1980	Sengeti	Buce Pantouw	Adnoes Dt. Sati	Pamulang Stud & Stable	
1981	Ken Ayu	L. Rawis	H. Slamet A.	Pamulang Stud & Stable	1:29.5
1982	Gandrung	A. Mamuaya	H. Slamet A.	Pamulang Stud & Stable	
1983	Wulan Sari	(–)	(–)	Naintex Stable Hasan Rahardja	
1984	Mawar Melati	J. Sumuweng	A. Lanujaya	Mawar Merah Stable	
1985	Liberty	J. Rattu	(–)	Naintex Stable; E. Darusman	
1986	(–)	(–)	(–)	(–)	
1987	Dewi Sawitri	N. Tuar	(–)	A. Suhardi	
1988	Ratu Mayapada	J. Sumuweng	Wahono AT	Pamulang Stud & Stable	
1989	Cancelled				
1990	Tri Gangga	Coen Singal	Edwin Basuki	Sukun Stable	
1991	Aster II	Soni Soleran	Edwin Basuki	Dr. Achmad Rizal	
1992	Ratu Ireng	I. Sondakh	Wahono AT	Pamulang Stud & Stable	1:29.75
1993	Melati Putih	E. Kosasih	Wahono AT	Ny. Mury Asmasoebrata	1:30.04
1994	Maya Sovereign	Harny Pantouw	Edwin Basuki	Pamulang Stud & Stable; Anugrah Stable	1:23.31
1995	Niken Ayu	M. Tewuh	A. F. Soma	Pamulang Stud & Stable; Wonohardjo Stable	1:22.56
1996	Lady Centavo	A. Rori	Wahono AT	Pamulang Stud & Stable; Ir. Jeane	
1997	Ratu Mayangkara	Welly Mewengkang	Wahono AT	Pamulang Stud & Stable; Ir. Jeane	
1998	Permata Rajawali	E. Sonitan	Iwan Kurniawan	Faisal Rival	
1999	Spicy	Coen Singal	F. Sondakh	Ny. Geisye M.	
2000	Brilliant Agam	A. Rori	Edwin Basuki	Ny. Yemita Febrius	1:43.31
2001	Ratu Nagari	F. Nayoan	Wahono AT	Pamulang Stud & Stable; Ir. Untung Joesoep	
2002	Magic Narita	Coen Singal	Edwin Basuki	Nikita Stable	1:42.54
2003	Dewi Milenia	E. Sonitan	Iwan Kurniawan	Aragon Stable	1:43.26
2004	Cindra Bumi	E. Sonitan	Iwan Kurniawan	Aragon Stable	1:43.55
2005	Pesona Karunia	H. Pantouw	Edwin Basuki	Nikita Stable	
2006	Fantasia Arumdalu	T. Pantouw	H. E. Bahar	Pamulang Stud & Stable; Mario R. Saleh Bahar	
2007	Tuah Nagari	Jendri Turangan	H. E. Bahar	Pamulang Stud & Stable; Mario R. Saleh Bahar	1:42.44
2008	King Dancer	Tristandi	F. Nayoan	Ir. Gunawan	
2009	Nifsu Shiam	Meikel Soleran	Edwin Basuki	M. Rizal (Tombo Ati Stable)	1:44.44
2010	Happy Jennifer	E. Sonitan	Iwan Kurniawan	H. Edri Anas	
2011	Amazing Grace	F. Nayoan	Welly Mewengkang	Hj. Haryati	1:53.96
2012	Tebaran Mega	Meikel Soleran	Berty Sondakh	Eclipse Stable; Ir. Iman Hartono	
2013	Maharani	Meikel Soleran	Rullie Soleran	Eclipse Stable; Ir. Iman Hartono	
2014	Zusi Eclipse	Meikel Soleran	Berty Sondakh	Eclipse Stable; Ir. Iman Hartono	
2015	Queen Emirate	Jemmy Runtu	Edi Womiling	King Halim Stable; Ny. Silvana Sicilia	
2016	Xena Eclipse	Meikel Soleran	Rullie Soleran	Eclipse Stable; Ir. Iman Hartono	1:43.32
2017	Tamara Eclipse	(–)	Rullie Soleran	Eclipse Stable; Ir. Iman Hartono	
2018	(–)	(–)	(–)	(–)	
2019	Munaja Terjinta	(–)	(–)	(–)	
2020	Cancelled due to COVID-19 pandemic				
2021	Maheswari Eclipse	(–)	Rullie Soleran	Eclipse Stable; Ir. Iman Hartono	
2022	AJR Mare	(–)	(–)	H. M Ridwan	
2023	Sunlight Nagari	Fajar Walangitan	Mario Bahar	Aryo Djojohadikusumo	
2024	P. Ratu Samudra	Marcel Singel	Ardhi Punta Wijaya	Hj. Haryati	
2025	Princess Gavi	Hanny Suoth	Karlan	King Halim Stable; Kusnadi Halim	
2026	Fiona of Khalim	Jemmy Runtu	Karlan	King Halim Stable; Kusnadi Halim	

== Sources ==
- Soehardjono, Oetari (1990). Kuda. Pamulang: Yayasan Pamulang Equestrian Centre. ISBN 9798196007.
- Soehadji; Muladno; Bandiati, Sri; Soekotjo, Wirasmono; Soehardjono, Oetari (2019). Sejarah Pembentukan Kuda Pacu Indonesia: Rumpun Baru Kuda Indonesia Karya Anak Bangsa. Jakarta: Gramedia Pustaka Utama. ISBN 9786020622446.
