= Sultan Agung Stadium =

Multi stadium in Bantul, Java, Indonesia

Sultan Agung Stadium ꦱ꧀ꦠꦣꦶꦪꦺꦴꦤ꧀ꦯꦸꦭ꧀ꦠꦤ꧀ꦄꦒꦸꦁ
- Stadion Sultan Agung
- SSA
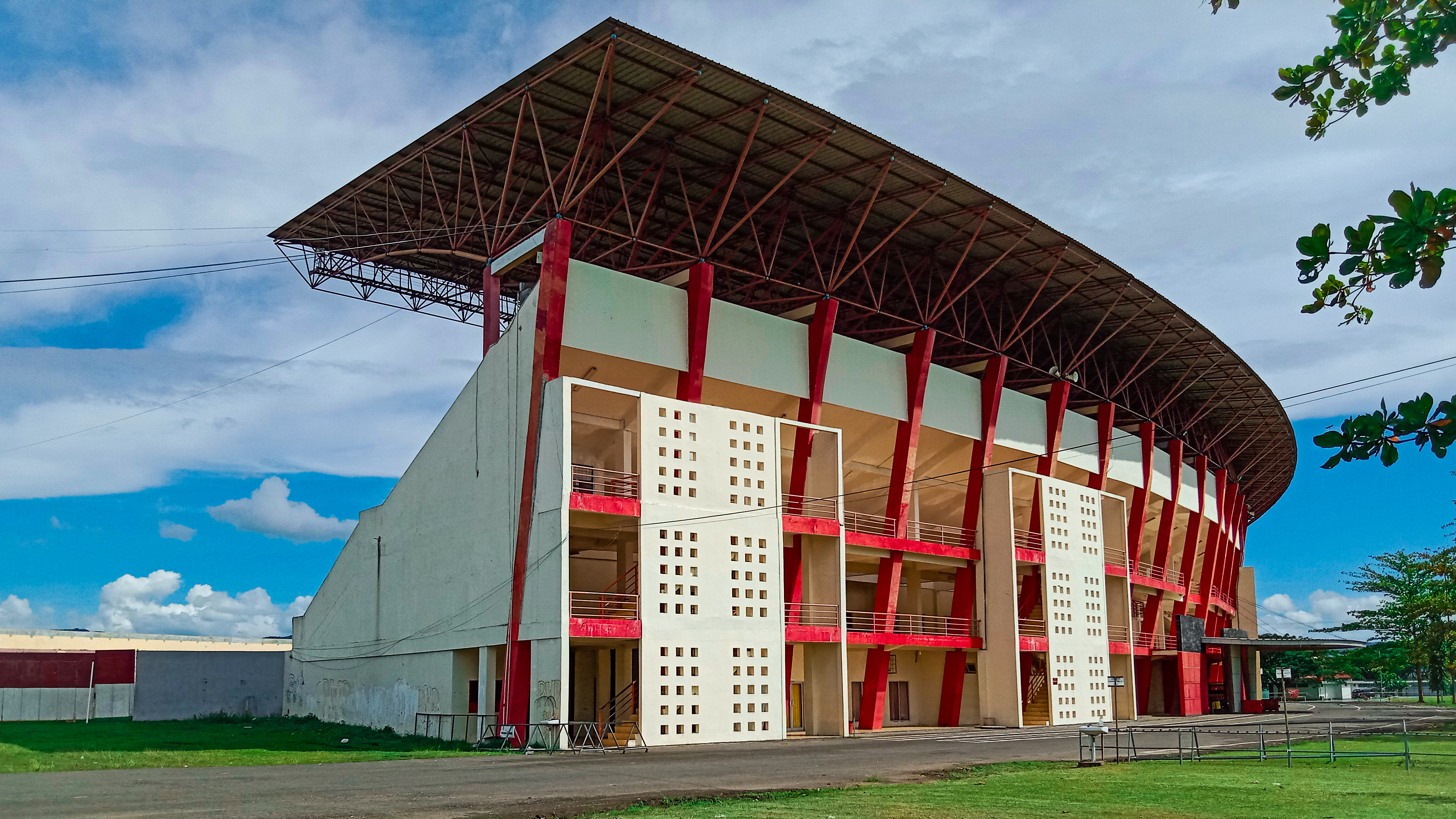
- Interactive map of Sultan Agung Stadium ꦱ꧀ꦠꦣꦶꦪꦺꦴꦤ꧀ꦯꦸꦭ꧀ꦠꦤ꧀ꦄꦒꦸꦁ
- Location: Bantul Regency, Special Region of Yogyakarta, Indonesia
- Coordinates: 7°52′30.9″S 110°22′49.4″E
- Owner: Government of Bantul Regency
- Operator: Government of Bantul Regency
- Capacity: 30,000
- Surface: Grass

Construction
- Built: 2004
- Opened: 24 June 2007
- Renovated: 2008

Tenants
- Persiba Bantul; PSIM Yogyakarta

Sultan Agung Stadium (Indonesian: Stadion Sultan Agung; Javanese: ꦱ꧀ꦠꦣꦶꦪꦺꦴꦤ꧀ꦯꦸꦭ꧀ꦠꦤ꧀ꦄꦒꦸꦁ) is a multi-use stadium in Bantul, Indonesia. It is currently used mostly for football matches and is used as the home venue for Persiba Bantul of the Liga Indonesia. The stadium has a capacity of 30,000. The stadium was built in 2004. It first started hosting matches from Liga Indonesia in 2005.

The stadium was inaugurated by the Governor of Yogyakarta Sri Sultan Hamengkubuwono X at the opening ceremony coincided PORDA Bantul DIY-IX on 24 June 2007. Though inaugurated in 2007, this stadium has been used to stage local football matches and Liga Indonesia since 2005.

Other than the football stadium, the Sultan Agung Sport Complex also houses venues for other various types of sports such as athletics, tennis, basketball, badminton, horse racing, and roller skating.

== Facilities ==
Sultan Agung Stadium has a football field measuring 105 meters long and 68 meters wide, the average FIFA standard. The field is surrounded by an athletics track and has a grandstand on the west side with a capacity of 5,000 spectators. Sultan Agung Stadium utilizes a subsurface drainage system.

Sultan Agung Stadium also has a complex that functions as a facility for various types of sports besides football, such as athletics, tennis, basketball, badminton, horse racing, roller skating, cycling, rock climbing, and archery.

=== Horse racing venue ===
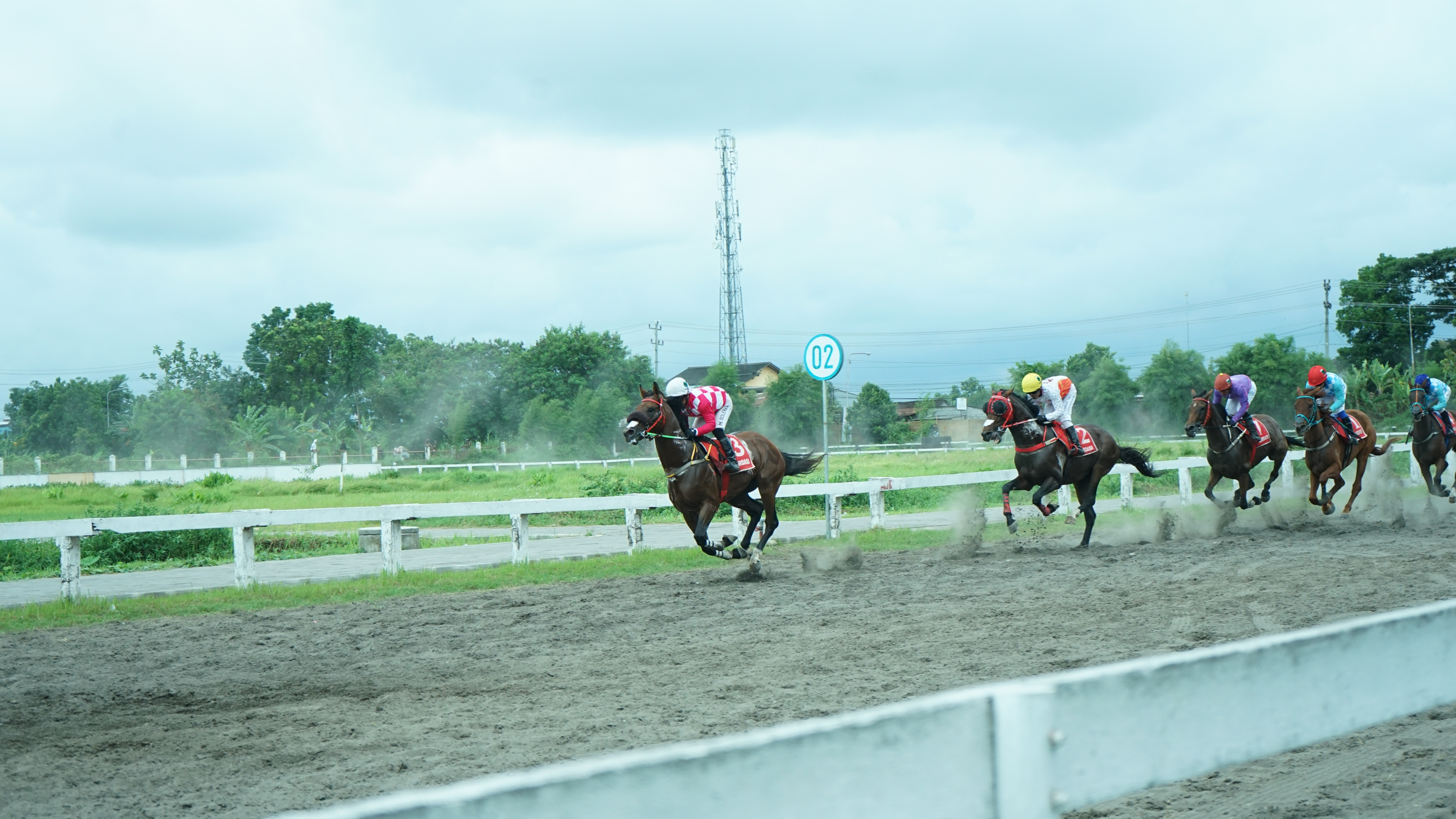
Horseracing at Sultan Agung Racecourse, Bantul, 2025

To the west of Sultan Agung Stadium, there is a national-standard horse racecourse covering an area of 8 hectares. This racecourse has a track length of 1,200 meters with a width of 16 meters.

Sultan Agung Racecourse frequently hosts various prestigious horse racing events, such as the Indonesia Derby (the final race in the Indonesian Triple Crown), Pertiwi Cup, Piala Raja Hamengkubuwono X, and Kejurnas (National Championship).
