= Tegalwaton Racecourse =

Horse racing venue in Central Java

Tegalwaton Racecourse Gelanggang Pacuan Kuda Tegalwaton
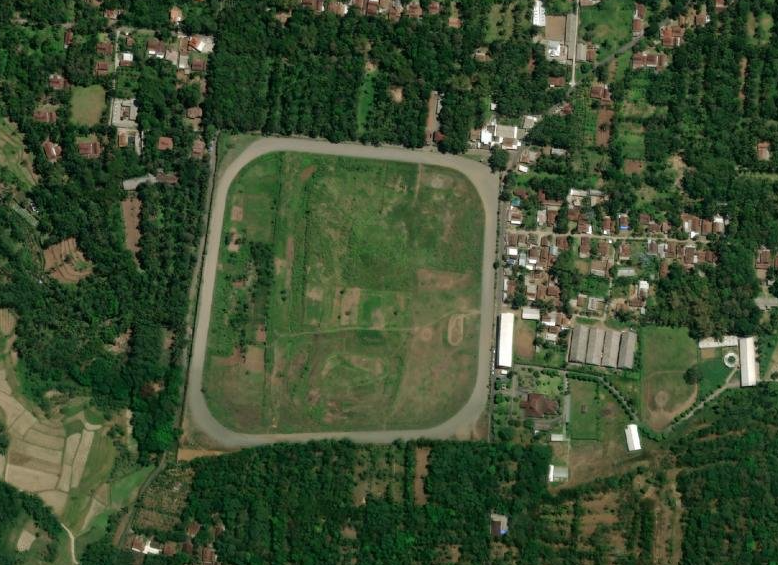
- Aerial photo of Tegalwaton Racecourse
- Interactive map of Tegalwaton Racecourse; Gelanggang Pacuan Kuda Tegalwaton
- Location: Semarang Regency, Central Java, Indonesia
- Coordinates: 7.382321°S 110.530808°E
- Owned by: Government of Semarang Regency
- Operated by: Pordasi
- Date opened: 2001
- Capacity: 1,000+
- Screened on: TVRI Sport
- Race type: Flat
- Course type: Dirt
- Notable races: Kejurnas Series; Jateng Derby; A.E. Kawilarang Memorial Cup (2023, 2025)

Tegalwaton Racecourse is a racecourse located in Tegalwaton, Semarang Regency, Central Java, Indonesia. This racecourse was built in 2001, and regularly used for the national scale horse racing event, the Jateng Derby, every year.

== Physical attributes ==
Tegalwaton Racecourse is a dirt track and has an area of approximately 13.5 hectares with a track that is 1,200 meters long and 15 meters wide. The horse racing track itself is a roughly square quadrilateral, measuring about 370 by 380 meters.

There are facilities for spectator stands, vendor stands, and stables for caring for the horse. This racecourse has a background view of Mount Merbabu.
