= Indonesia's Horse Racing (horse racing series) =

Horse racing series in Indonesia

- Current season, competition or edition: 2026 Indonesia's Horse Racing Season
- Sport: Horse Racing
- Organizing body: PORDASI; SARGA.CO
- Most recent champions: King Argentin (Derby winner)
- Website: sarga.co

Indonesia's Horse Racing, or IHR for short, is the annual national-level horse racing series in Indonesia. Promoters SARGA.CO, in collaboration with the Equestrian Association of Indonesia, first organized races in 2023 as a way to popularize Indonesian horse racing. The series was then structured as a racing season from 2025. It includes historic national-level races, including the National Championship and the Triple Crown, spanning an entire year.

The most recent Indonesia Derby winner is King Argentin in 2025, who also achieved the Triple Crown.

== History ==
Horse racing in Indonesia experienced a decline in popularity when gambling was banned in 1981, and began plummeting further ever since the fall of Suharto. The trend continued on through the 2010s, and was detrimental to the industry. Pulomas Racecourse, Indonesia's flagship racecourse, gradually lost its prominence as facilities were neglected and damaged from floods. The venue was eventually closed in 2016 to make way for the Jakarta International Equestrian Park, an equestrian venue for the 18th Asian Games.

In 2023, Sarga.co, a company that specializes in promoting equine sports, collaborated with the Equestrian Association of Indonesia to organize national horse races. The goal was to preserve, rebuild, and develop Indonesia's horse racing industry, as well as to popularize horse racing among the general public. 2023 had two events organized under Sarga.co, which were the first two Triple Crown races. The following year, 2024, Sarga.co organized four events, which were the first Triple Crown series, the Indonesia Derby (which includes the first leg of the National Championships), the second leg of the National Championships, and the PP PORDASI Chairman Cup. And in January 2025, they held the A.E. Kawilarang Memorial Cup at Tegalwaton Racecourse.

In February 2025, Sarga.co announced a 10-race calendar for the 2025 season, with the campaign title The Race of Rising Stars. 2025 was the first time the name Indonesia's Horse Racing was used. It was also the first time the national racing year was structured as a season. Additionally, after the global release of Umamusume: Pretty Derby, a Japanese gacha game from the franchise of the same name created by Cygames that centers on anthropomorphized Japanese race horses, in June 2025 and began trending worldwide, Indonesia's Horse Racing events subsequently gained significant attention. The season ultimately consisted of nine races across the year, including the Triple Crowns, both National Championship legs, the Jateng Derby, the King Hamengku Buwono X Cup, as well as other events. King Argentine, a colt from King Halim Stable, won the Derby as well as the Triple Crown.

In addition to the Triple Crown and the National Championship, the 2026 season will have a new series, the King's Cup.

== Races ==
The following races are scheduled for the 2026 season.

2026 Indonesia's Horse Racing Season
Date	Event	Venue	Series		
Date	Event	Venue	Triple Crown	Kejurnas	King's Cup
15 February	Jateng Derby 2026	Tegalwaton Racecourse, Central Java			
4 April	Triple Crown Seri I & Pertiwi Cup 2026	Sultan Agung Racecourse, DI Yogyakarta	Yes		
10 May	Mangkunegara X Cup & Triple Crown Seri II 2026	Tegalwaton Racecourse, Central Java	Yes		Yes
13 June	Paku Alam Cup 2026	Sultan Agung Racecourse, DI Yogyakarta			Yes
26 July	60th Kejurnas Seri I - Indonesia Derby 2026	Legokjawa Racecourse, West Java	Yes	Yes	
23 August	Indonesia's Horse Racing Cup I 2026	West Sumatra			
25 October	60th Kejurnas Seri II & PP PORDASI Chairman Cup 2026	North Sulawesi		Yes	
6 December	King Hamengkubuwono X Cup 2026	Sultan Agung Racecourse, DI Yogyakarta			Yes

== Editions ==
Season	Races	Derby winner	President's Cup winner	Indonesia's Horse Racing Awards				Additional notes
Season	Races	Derby winner	President's Cup winner	Best Horse	Best Jockey	Best Trainer	Best Stable	Additional notes
2025	9	King Argentin	DKI Jakarta	King Argentin	Meikel Soleran	Rulli Soleran	King Halim Stable	Triple Crown
2026	8							

== See also ==
- Horse racing in Indonesia
- Indonesia Derby
- Kejurnas Pacuan Kuda PORDASI
