= Big Ben (horse, foaled 1987) =

Indonesian racehorse

- Breed: G2 (PORDASI classification)
- Sire: Swantown Prince
- Grandsire: Imperial Prince
- Dam: Putri Gunung
- Damsire: Tale House
- Sex: Colt
- Foaled: May 7, 1987
- Country: Indonesia
- Colour: Light bay (merah)
- Breeder: Dr. Achmad Rizal
- Owner: Dr. Achmad Rizal
- Trainer: Edwin Basuki
- Jockey: Coen Singal

Major wins
- Indonesia Derby (1990); Soeharto Cup Series 2 (1992)

Big Ben or Big Bend (foaled May 7, 1987 in West Sumatra) was an Indonesian racehorse. His major win at national race was in the 1990 Indonesia Derby.

== Background ==
Big Ben was a light bay colt foaled on May 7, 1987, at West Sumatra. His sire is Swantown Prince (THB AUS), a son of Imperial Prince (THB AUS), and his dam is Putri Gunung (G1), a daughter of Tale House (THB AUS). Big Ben breed was classified as G2 (Generasi ke-2) based on the Pordasi classification, with a proportion of Thoroughbred genetic material more than 75%.

Big Ben was the third foal of Putri Gunung. He was a brother to Galigo (winner of the 1988 Indonesia Derby) and Anggrek. During his racing career, he represented the West Sumatra contingent.

== Racing career ==
=== Racing form ===
Date	Racecourse	Race	Class	Distance	Entry	HN	Finished	Time	Jockey	Winner (2nd place)	Ref.
Jul 29, 1990	Pulomas	Indonesia Derby	Derby	1400m			1st		Coen Singal		
Sep 20, 1992	Pulomas	Piala Soeharto Series 2	Open A	2000m			1st		Coen Singal	(Thunder Bird)	
Jan 26, 1993	Pulomas	Piala Siti Hardiyanti Rukmana	Open	2000m			4th		Coen Singal	Thunder Bird	
Sep 3, 1995	Pulomas	Piala Soeharto Series 2	Open A	1300m			2nd		Coen Singal	Maya Sovereign	

== Pedigree ==
Pedigree of Big Ben (IDN), light bay stallion, 1987
Sire Swantown Prince (AUS)	Imperial Prince (IRE)	Sir Ivor (USA)	Sir Gaylord (USA)
Sire Swantown Prince (AUS)	Imperial Prince (IRE)	Sir Ivor (USA)	Attica (USA)
Sire Swantown Prince (AUS)	Imperial Prince (IRE)	Bleu Azur (GB)	Crepello (GB)
Sire Swantown Prince (AUS)	Imperial Prince (IRE)	Bleu Azur (GB)	Blue Prelude (GB)
Sire Swantown Prince (AUS)	Decimal (AUS)	Wilkes (FR)	Court Martial (GB)
Sire Swantown Prince (AUS)	Decimal (AUS)	Wilkes (FR)	Sans Tares (GB)
Sire Swantown Prince (AUS)	Decimal (AUS)	Little Dot (AUS)	Grey Sovereign (GB)
Sire Swantown Prince (AUS)	Decimal (AUS)	Little Dot (AUS)	Wee Spot (GB)
Dam Putri Gunung (IDN) G1	Tale House (AUS)	–	–
Dam Putri Gunung (IDN) G1	Tale House (AUS)	–	–
Dam Putri Gunung (IDN) G1	Tale House (AUS)	–	–
Dam Putri Gunung (IDN) G1	Tale House (AUS)	–	–
Dam Putri Gunung (IDN) G1	Merah Indo Baleh (IDN); Local breed	–	–
Dam Putri Gunung (IDN) G1	Merah Indo Baleh (IDN); Local breed	–	–
Dam Putri Gunung (IDN) G1	Merah Indo Baleh (IDN); Local breed	–	–
Dam Putri Gunung (IDN) G1	Merah Indo Baleh (IDN); Local breed	–	–
