= Nefertiti (horse) =

Indonesian racehorse

- Breed: G4 (PORDASI classification)
- Sire: Eagling
- Grandsire: Nureyev
- Dam: Nefertari
- Damsire: Darth Vader
- Sex: Mare
- Foaled: 9 September 1995
- Country: Indonesia
- Colour: Bay (jragem)
- Breeder: Pamulang Stable
- Trainer: Wahono A.T.
- Jockey: Coen Singal

Major wins
- Indonesia Derby (1999)

Nefertiti (foaled September 9, 1995 in Tangerang, Banten) is an Indonesian racehorse. Her major win at national race was in the 1999 Indonesia Derby.

== Background ==
Nefertiti is a bay mare foaled on September 9, 1995, at Pamulang Stable in Tangerang, Banten (formerly West Java). Her sire is Eagling (THB), a son of Nureyev, and her dam is Nefertari (G3), a daughter of Darth Vader. Nefertiti breed is classified as G4 (Generasi ke-4) based on the Pordasi classification, with a proportion of Thoroughbred genetic material more than 87.5%.

Her name, Nefertiti, was taken from an Ancient Egyptian Queen, the consort of pharaoh Amenhotep IV.

== Racing career ==
During her national racing career, Nefertiti only won a few races. In the 1999 Piala Bhayangkara Series I at Pulomas Racecourse, she achieved third place in the derby class qualification (1,850 m), with Arung Samudera and Evanda in first and second place respectively. In the same race, the top and most expensive horse in Indonesia at that time, Fero Star, finished in 8th place. With this, Nefertiti qualified for the final of the 1999 Indonesia Derby.

After passing the derby class qualification, Nefertiti is entitled to continue to the 1999 Indonesia Derby at Pulomas, running over a distance of 1,850 meters. In the race, Nefertiti faced two favorites: Spicy and Arung Samudera. With veteran jockey Coen Singal, Nefertiti finished first, followed by Arung Samudera in second, and Spicy in sixth.

After the Indonesian Derby, Nefertiti immediately ended her career as a racehorse and became a broodmare.

=== Racing form ===
Date	Racecourse	Race	Class	Distance	Entry	HN	Finished	Time	Jockey	Winner (Runner-up)	Ref.
Jul 11, 1999	Pulomas	Qualification		1,850 M	12		3rd		Coen Singal	Arung Samudera	
Jul 25, 1999	Pulomas	Indonesia Derby	Derby	1,850 M	12		1st		Coen Singal	(Arung Samudera)	

== Pedigree ==
Pedigree of Nefertiti (IDN), bay mare, 1995
Sire Eagling (GB)	Nureyev (USA)	Northern Dancer (CAN)	Nearctic (CAN)
Sire Eagling (GB)	Nureyev (USA)	Northern Dancer (CAN)	Natalma (USA)
Sire Eagling (GB)	Nureyev (USA)	Special (USA)	Forli (ARG)
Sire Eagling (GB)	Nureyev (USA)	Special (USA)	Thong (USA)
Sire Eagling (GB)	Magic Flute (GB)	Tudor Melody (IRE)	Tudor Minstrel (GB)
Sire Eagling (GB)	Magic Flute (GB)	Tudor Melody (IRE)	Matelda (GB)
Sire Eagling (GB)	Magic Flute (GB)	Filigrana	Niccolo Dellarca (GB)
Sire Eagling (GB)	Magic Flute (GB)	Filigrana	Gamble In Gold (GB)
Dam Nefertari (IDN)	Darth Vader (AUS)	Buoy (GB)	Aureole (GB)
Dam Nefertari (IDN)	Darth Vader (AUS)	Buoy (GB)	Ripeck (GB)
Dam Nefertari (IDN)	Darth Vader (AUS)	Gay Lass (GB)	Galivanter (IRE)
Dam Nefertari (IDN)	Darth Vader (AUS)	Gay Lass (GB)	Game Girl (GB)
Dam Nefertari (IDN)	Manalagi (IDN)	—	—
Dam Nefertari (IDN)	Manalagi (IDN)	—	—
Dam Nefertari (IDN)	Manalagi (IDN)	—	—
Dam Nefertari (IDN)	Manalagi (IDN)	—	—
