= Galigo (horse) =

Indonesian racehorse

- Breed: G2 (PORDASI classification)
- Sire: Cut And Deal
- Grandsire: Holborn
- Dam: Putri Gunung
- Damsire: Tale House
- Sex: Mare
- Foaled: 4 October 1984
- Country: Indonesia
- Colour: Chestnut (napas)
- Breeder: Dr. Achmad Rizal
- Owner: Dr. Achmad Rizal
- Trainer: Edwin Basuki
- Jockey: Coen Signal

Major wins
- Indonesia Derby (1988); Soeharto Cup (1988)

Galigo (foaled October 4, 1984 in West Sumatra) was an Indonesian racehorse. Her major wins includes the 1988 Indonesia Derby and Soeharto Cup.

== Background ==
Galigo was a bay mare foaled on October 4, 1984 at West Sumatra. Her sire is Cut And Deal (THB), a son of Holborn (THB), and her dam is Putri Gunung (G1), a daughter of Tale House (THB). Putri Gunung is a daughter of Tale House (THB AUS) and Merah Indo Baleh (a local breed). Putri Gunung previously qualified for the 17th Kejurnas in the Class 1 (1,400m distance). However, she failed to secure first place at the Kejurnas.

Galigo was the first horse bred in West Sumatra to win the Indonesia Derby in 1988. Her legs were slightly deformed at birth. Despite this, Galigo had excellent balance and was a very fast runner. Even before the Indonesia Derby, Galigo had already won six races.

== Racing career ==
Before the Indonesia Derby, Galigo had won at least six races. In 1987, the Kejurnas Pacuan Kuda (National Horse Racing Championship) was held at Arcamanik Racecourse, Bandung. Galigo, with jockey Adrial, raced in the 1,000m additional class and won.

In August 1988, the Kejurnas Series I for the Indonesia Derby was held in Pulomas Racecourse, Jakarta. Galigo, ridden by jockey C. Singal, won first place in the 1400m distance with a time of 1:46,03. At 100m, Galigo shot to the lead, leaving her rivals far behind. Second place in the class was claimed by Lady Victoria, though she was 100m behind. Meanwhile, Areda won third place.

In September 1988, the Kejurnas Series II for the Soeharto Cup was held at Pulomas. In Class A, Galigo, with jockey C. Singal, soared, consistently leading his opponents and winning the race in that class. She defeated Liberti (West Java) and Bendang (North Sulawesi).

Galigo was the first horse from West Sumatra to win the Kejurnas series. This caused the people of West Sumatra, especially Padang, to enthusiastically celebrate her victory. Galigo's trophy was paraded around Padang City.

=== Racing form ===
Date	Racecourse	Race	Class	Distance	Entry	HN	Finished	Time	Jockey	Winner (2nd place)	Ref.
1987	Arcamanik	Kejurnas		1,000 M			1st		Adrial		
Jun 6, 1988	Pulomas	A. Bakrie Memorial	3YO	1,400 M			2nd		Coen Singal	Aradea	
Jul 31, 1988	Pulomas	Kejurnas Series I (Indonesia Derby)	Derby	1,400 M			1st		Coen Singal	(Lady Victoria)	
Sep 25, 1988	Pulomas	Kejurnas Series II	A	1,600 M			1st		Coen Singal	(Liberti)	

== Pedigree ==
Pedigree of Galigo (IDN), chestnut mare, 1984
Sire Cut And Deal (AUS) - 1970	Holborn (IRE) - 1962	Pall Mall (IRE) - 1955	Palestine (GB)
Sire Cut And Deal (AUS) - 1970	Holborn (IRE) - 1962	Pall Mall (IRE) - 1955	Malapert (GB)
Sire Cut And Deal (AUS) - 1970	Holborn (IRE) - 1962	Hattons Last (IRE) - 1955	The Phoenix (GB)
Sire Cut And Deal (AUS) - 1970	Holborn (IRE) - 1962	Hattons Last (IRE) - 1955	Hatton (GB)
Sire Cut And Deal (AUS) - 1970	Masobelle (AUS) - 1958	Masthead (GB) - 1944	Blue Peter (GB)
Sire Cut And Deal (AUS) - 1970	Masobelle (AUS) - 1958	Masthead (GB) - 1944	Schiaparelli (GB)
Sire Cut And Deal (AUS) - 1970	Masobelle (AUS) - 1958	Bula (AUS) - 1950	Kaa (GB)
Sire Cut And Deal (AUS) - 1970	Masobelle (AUS) - 1958	Bula (AUS) - 1950	Kaybula (AUS)
Dam Putri Gunung (IDN) - 1980	Tale House (AUS)	–	–
Dam Putri Gunung (IDN) - 1980	Tale House (AUS)	–	–
Dam Putri Gunung (IDN) - 1980	Tale House (AUS)	–	–
Dam Putri Gunung (IDN) - 1980	Tale House (AUS)	–	–
Dam Putri Gunung (IDN) - 1980	Merah Indo Baleh (IDN) - 1973	–	–
Dam Putri Gunung (IDN) - 1980	Merah Indo Baleh (IDN) - 1973	–	–
Dam Putri Gunung (IDN) - 1980	Merah Indo Baleh (IDN) - 1973	–	–
Dam Putri Gunung (IDN) - 1980	Merah Indo Baleh (IDN) - 1973	–	–
