= Indonesia Derby =

- Previous: 2025; Next: 2026
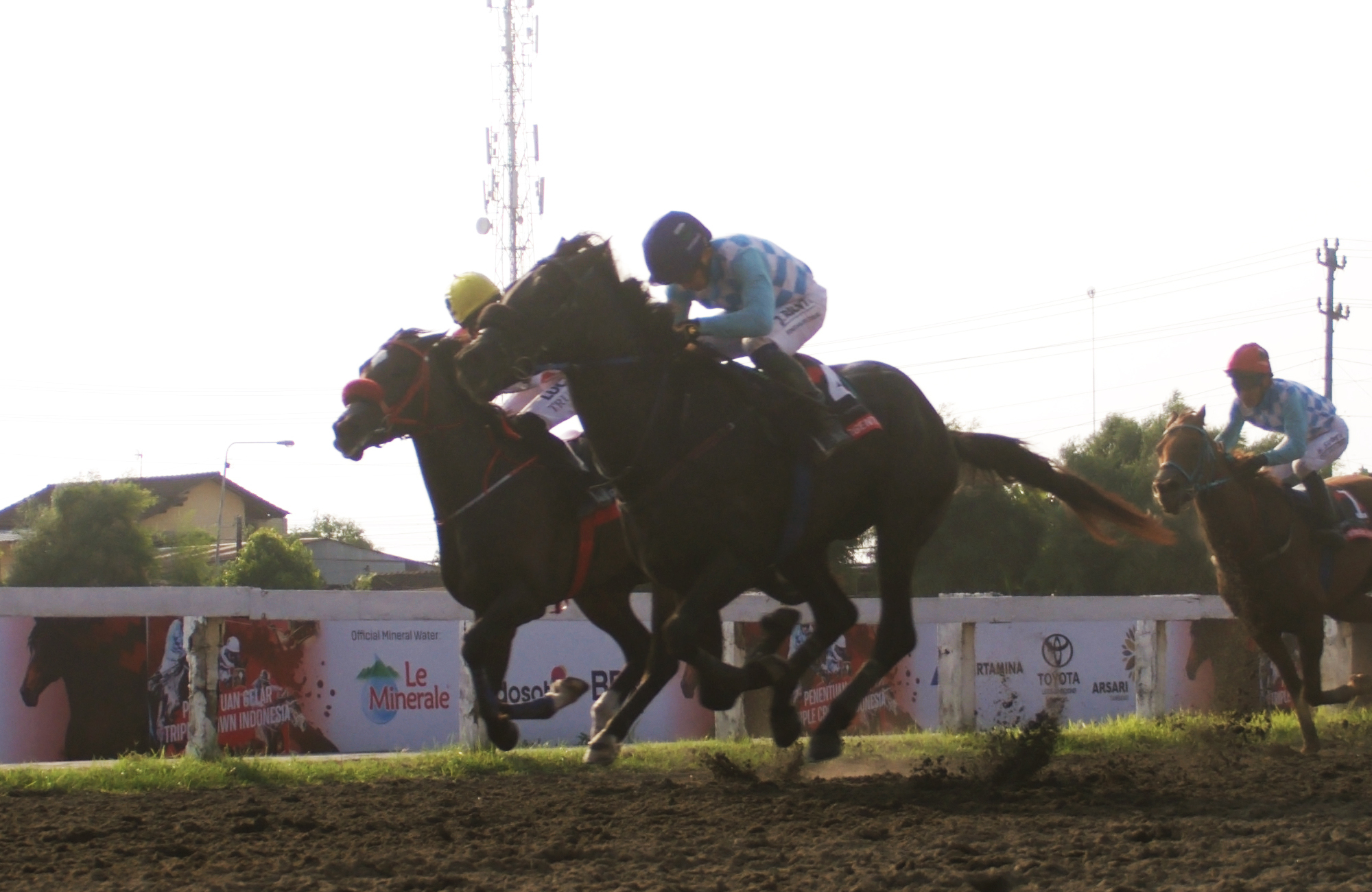
- 2025 Indonesia Derby winner King Argentin
- Inaugurated: 1972 (as Open); 1974 (as 3-year-old Derby)
- Race type: Flat racing
- Website: sarga.co

Race information
- Distance: 2000 meters (1 1/4 miles)
- Surface: Dirt
- Track: Right-handed
- Qualification: 3-year-old Derby Class; G/KP/Kuda Pacu Indonesia
- Purse: Rp.250,000,000 (as of 2026): 1st: Rp.125,000,000 + 43,750,000; 2nd: Rp.37,500,000; 3rd: Rp.25,000,000; 4th: Rp.12,500,000; 5th: Rp.6,250,000; Winning Breeder:Rp.25,000,000
- Bonuses: Indonesian Triple Crown; Winner of Triple Crown Series I, Triple Crown Series II, Indonesia Derby; Rp300,000,000

Indonesia Derby
2025

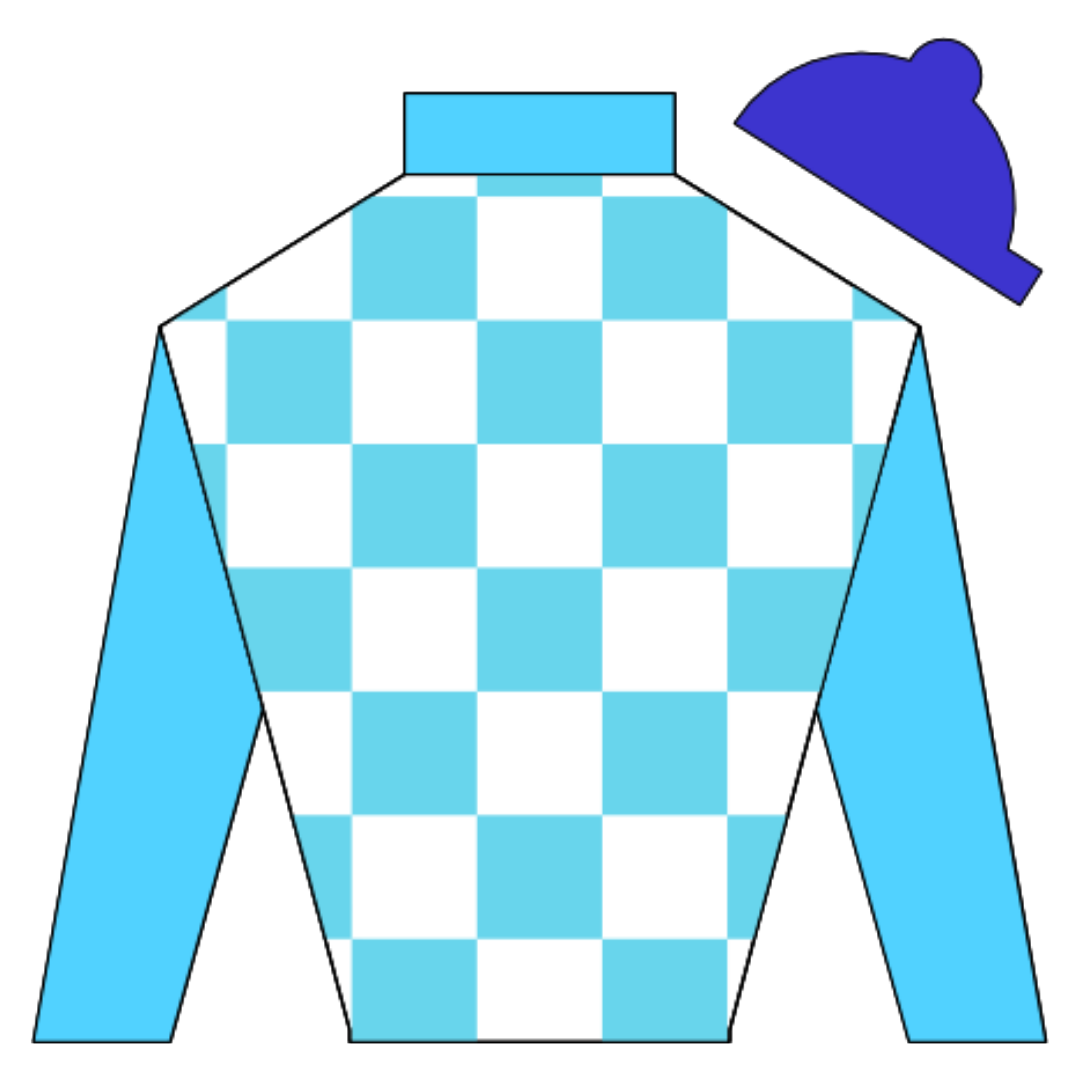
King Argentin

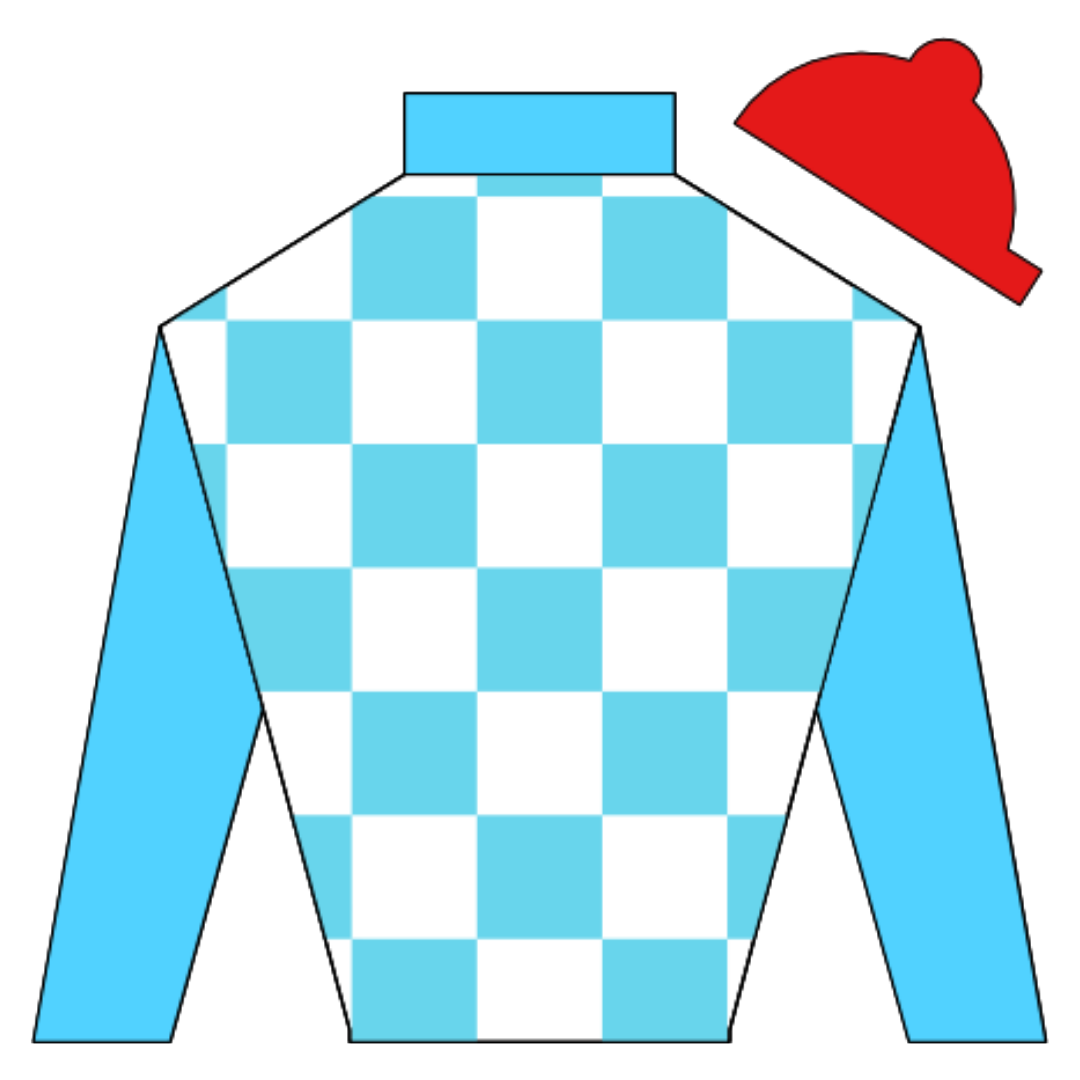
Princess Gavi

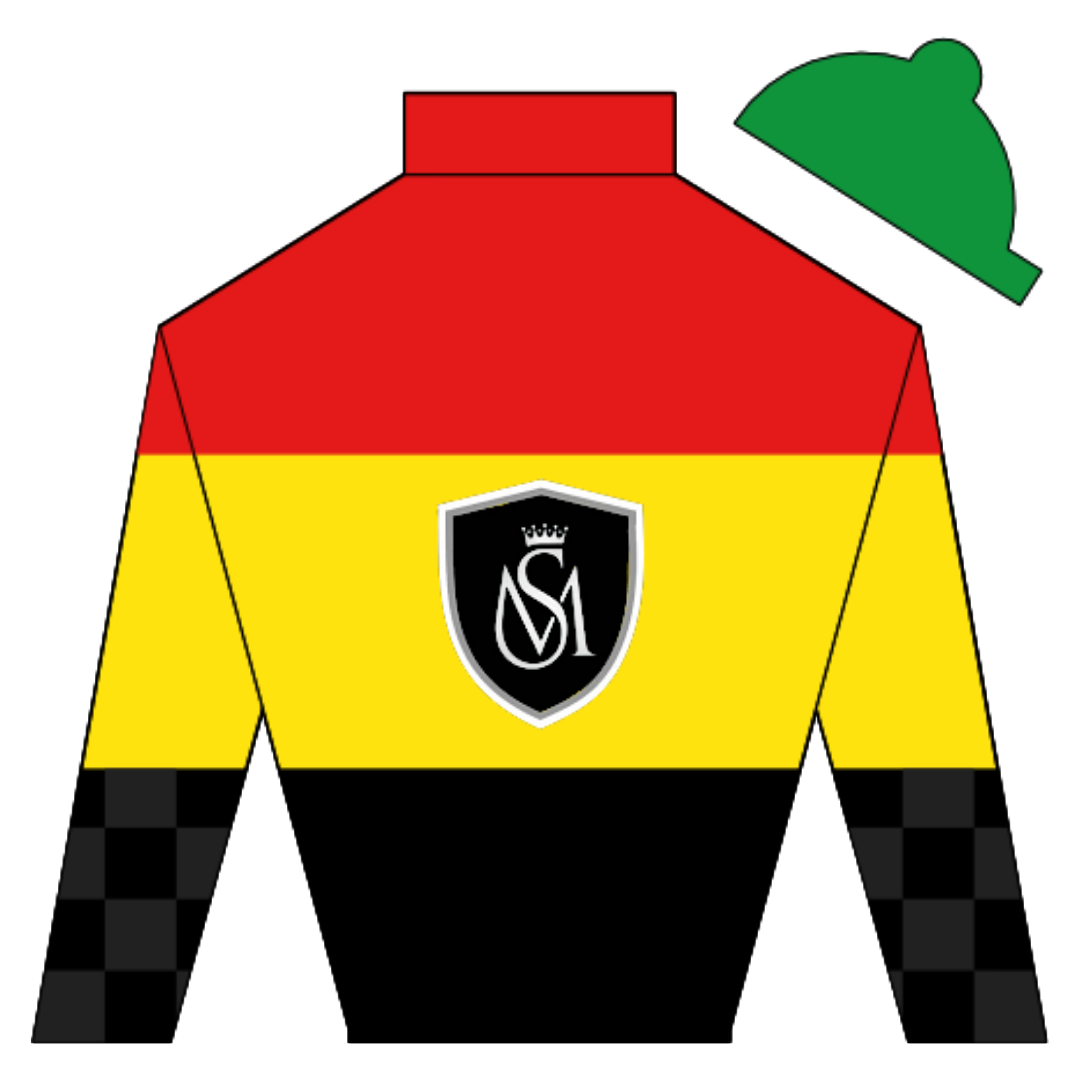
Romantic Spartan

Previous years

2024

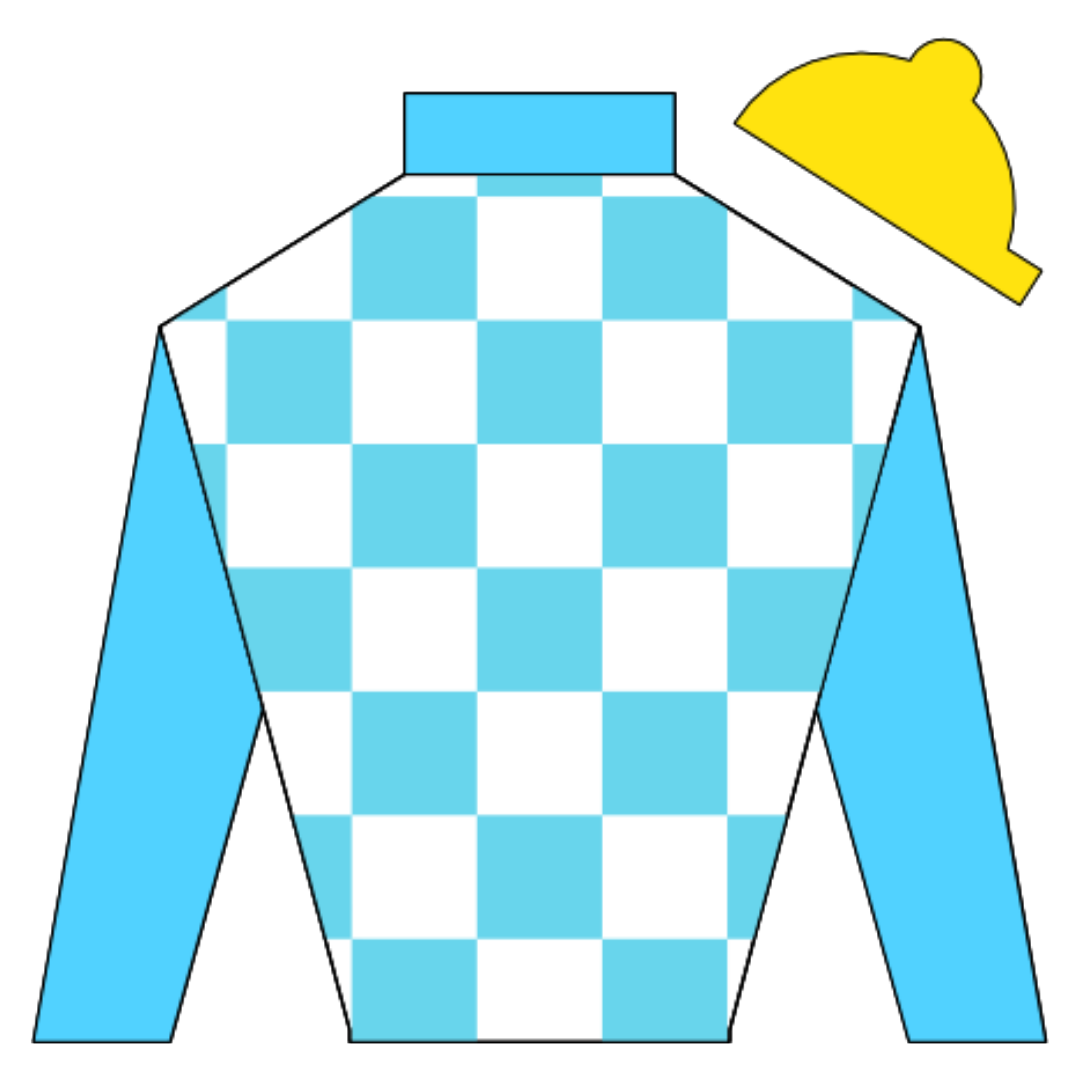
Rapid Dash

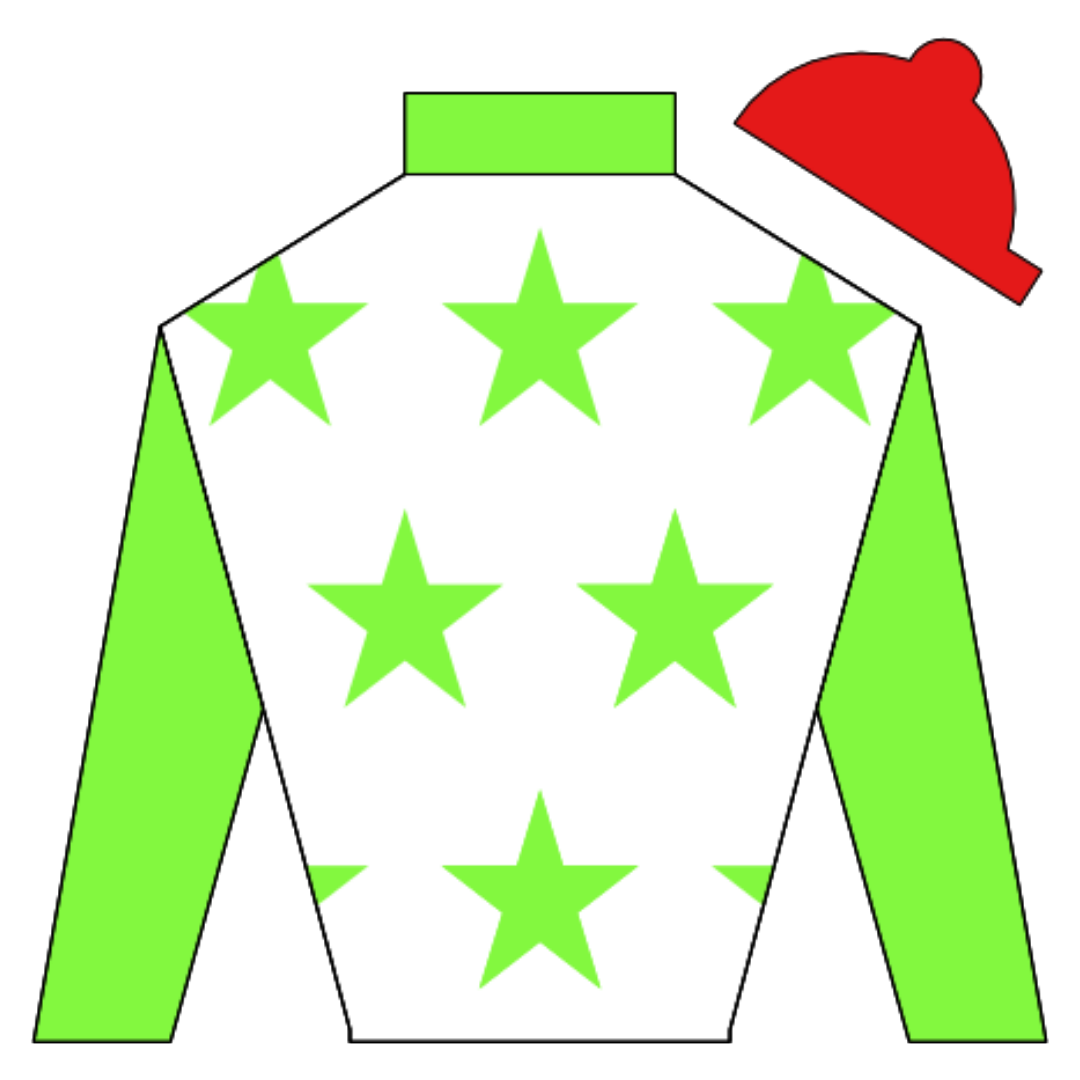
Naga Sembilan

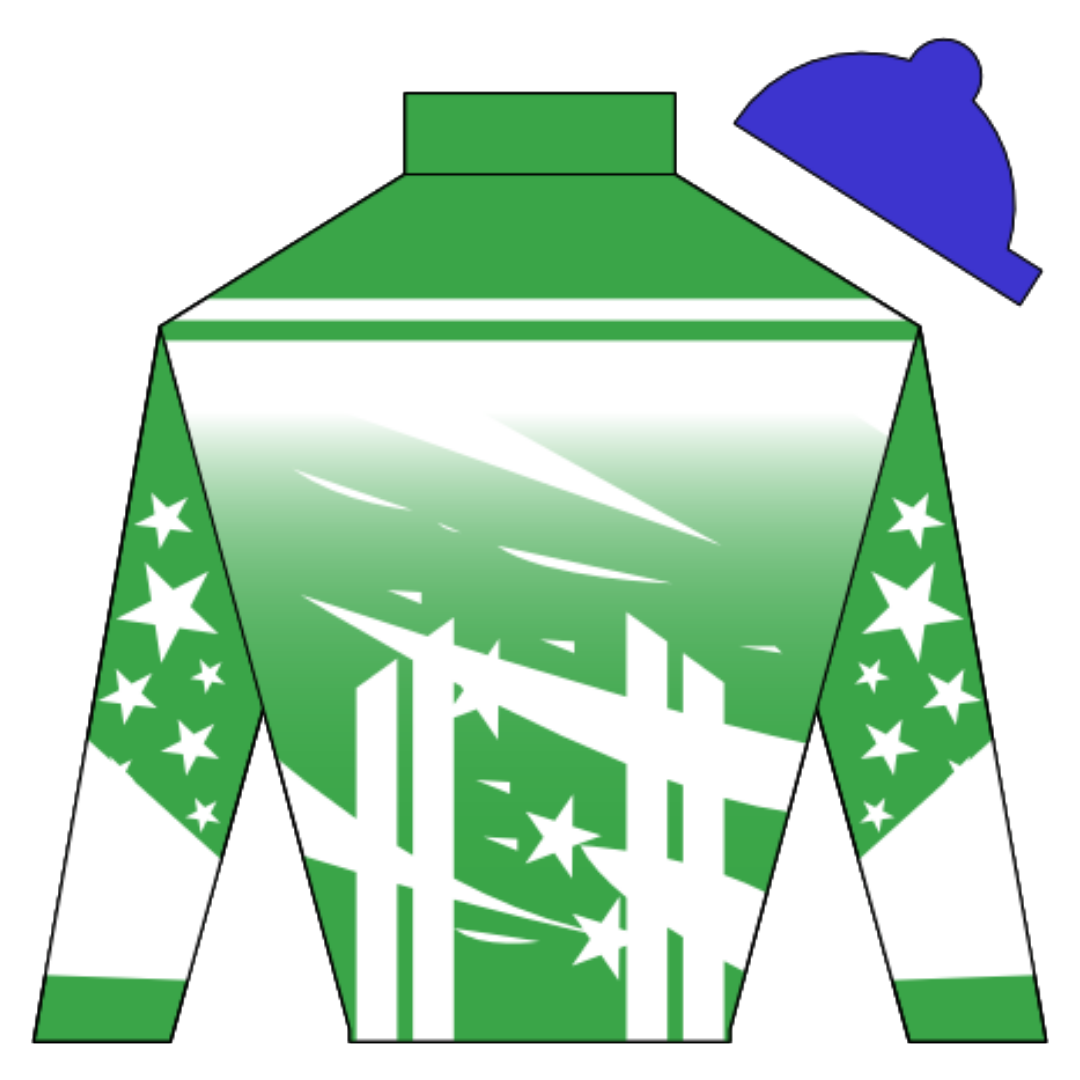
Amanecer Nagari

2023

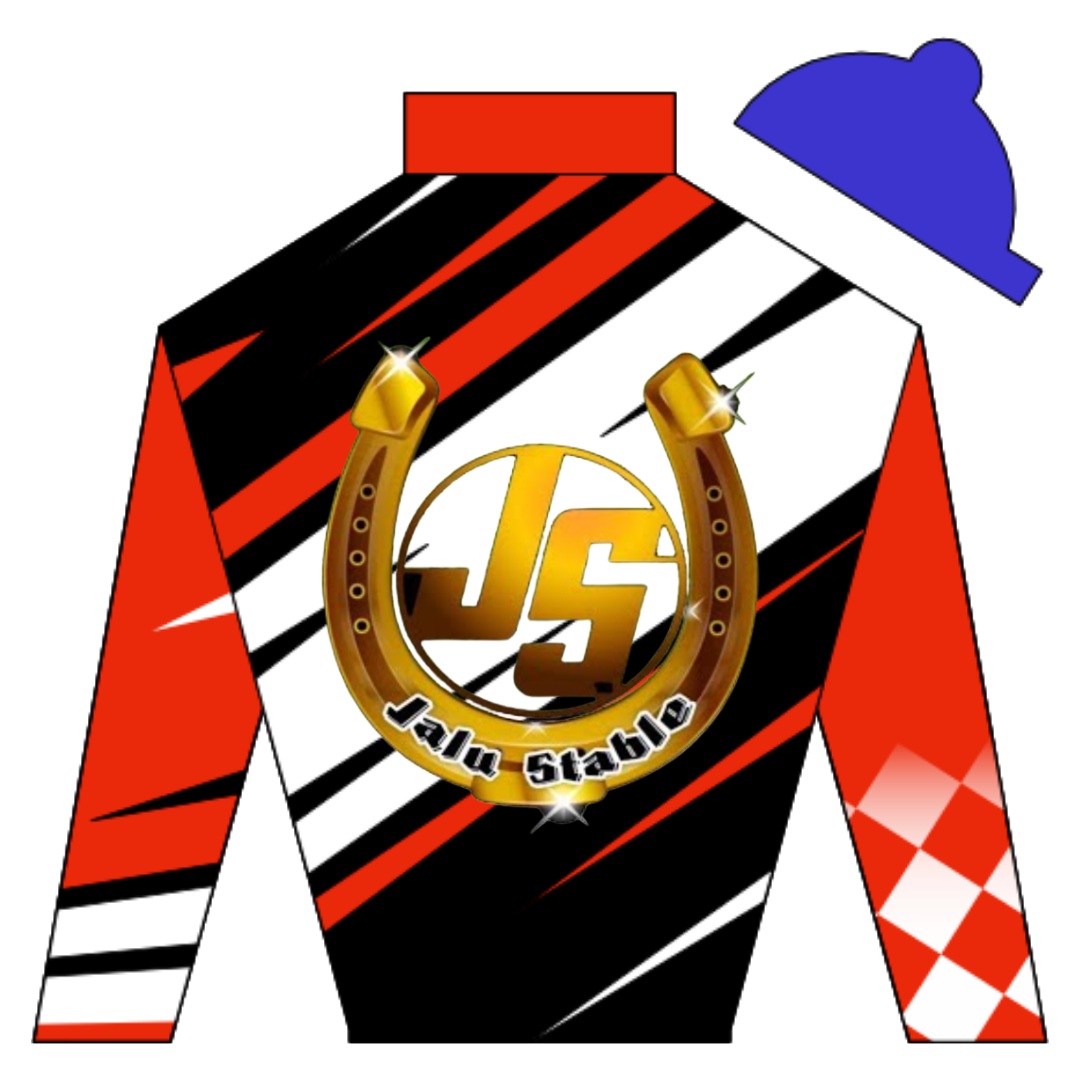
Bintang Maja

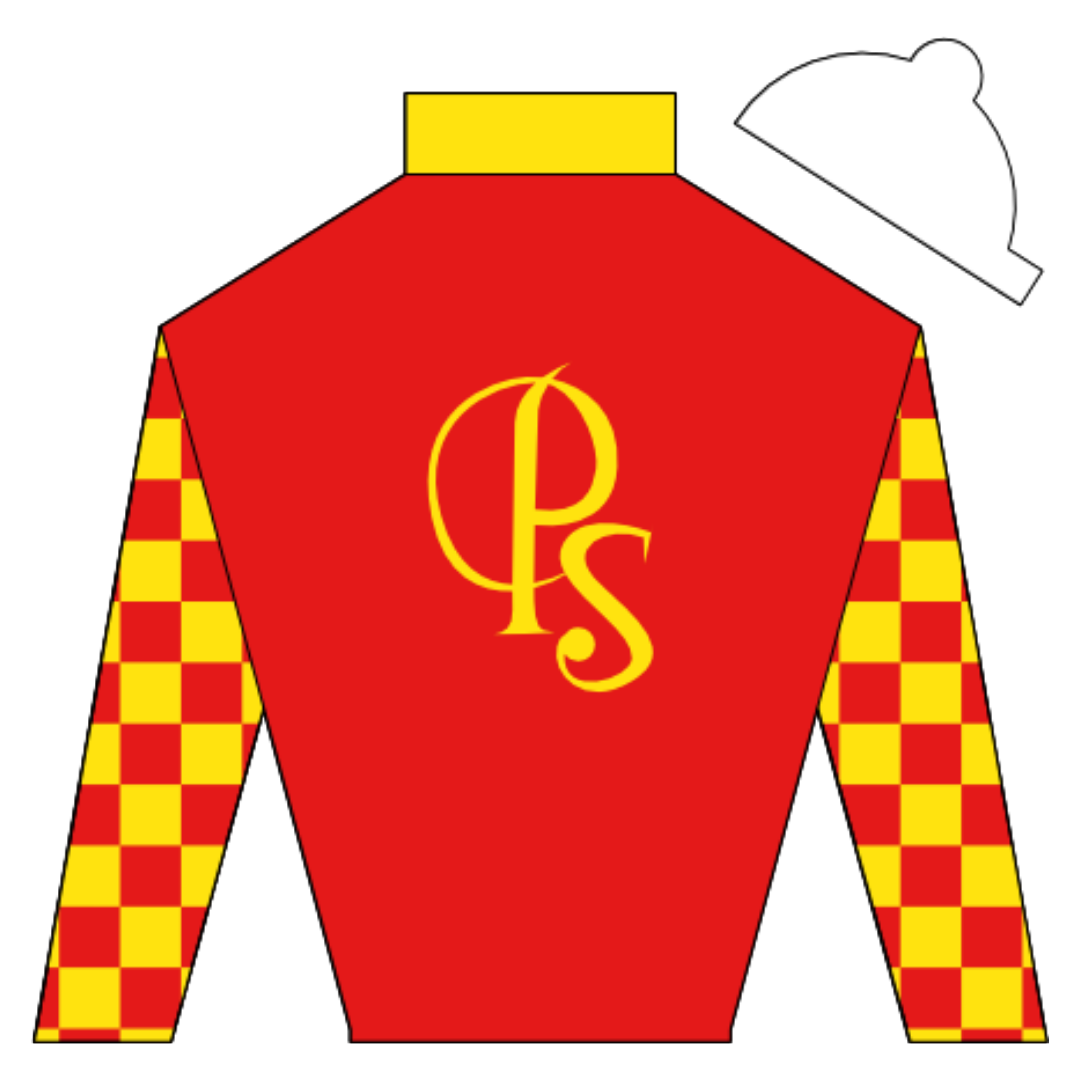
Ibrani Sion

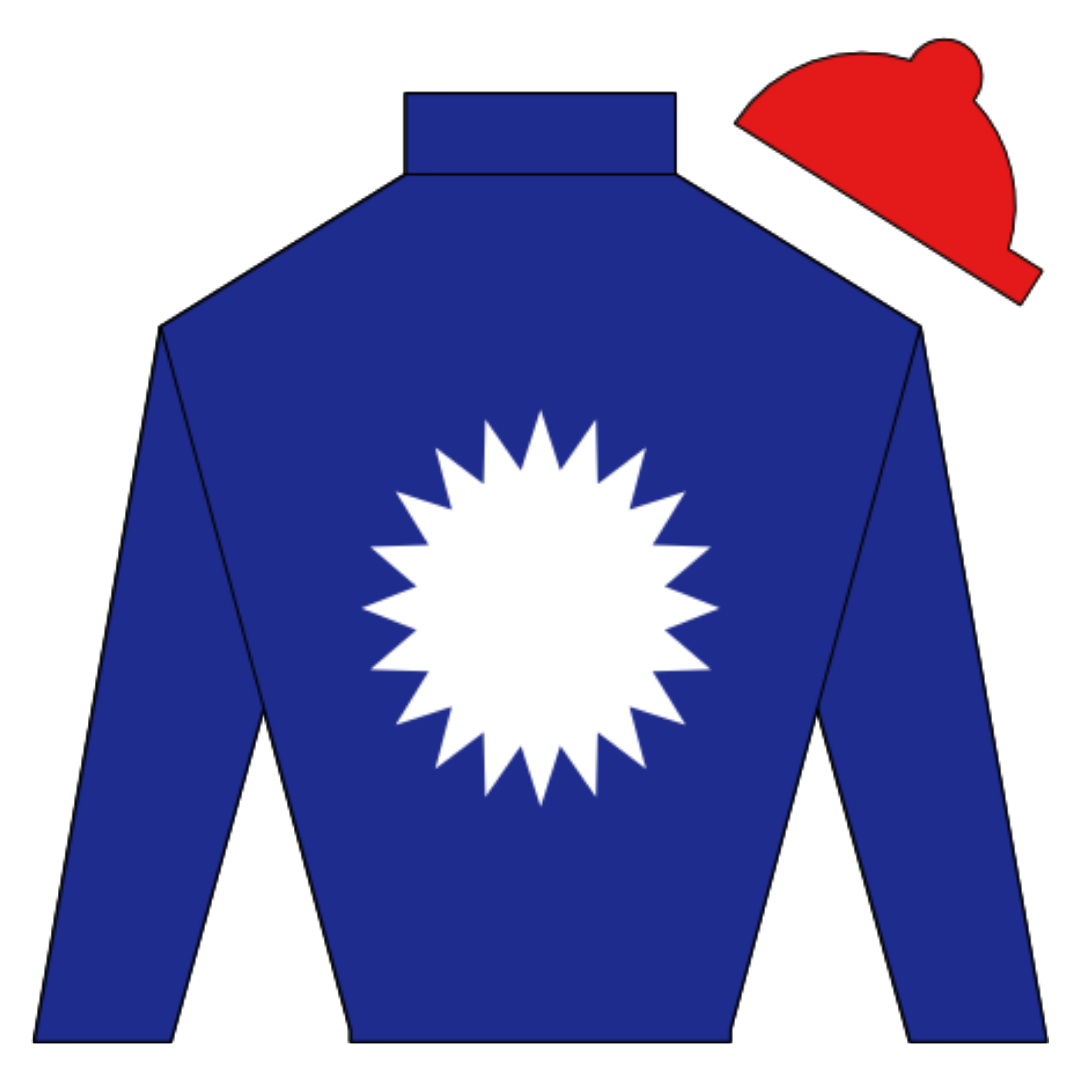
Sunlight Nagari

2022

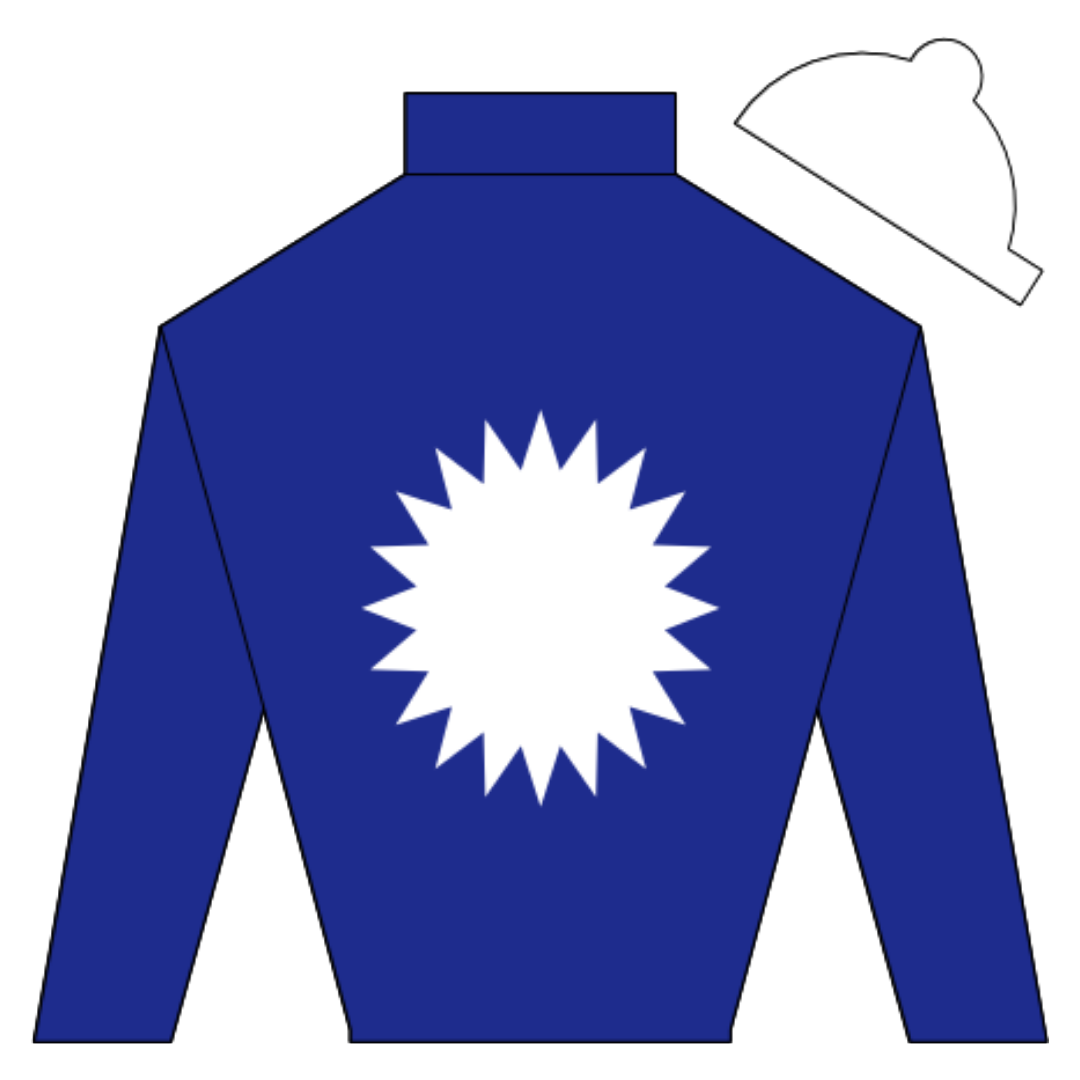
Lyana Nagari

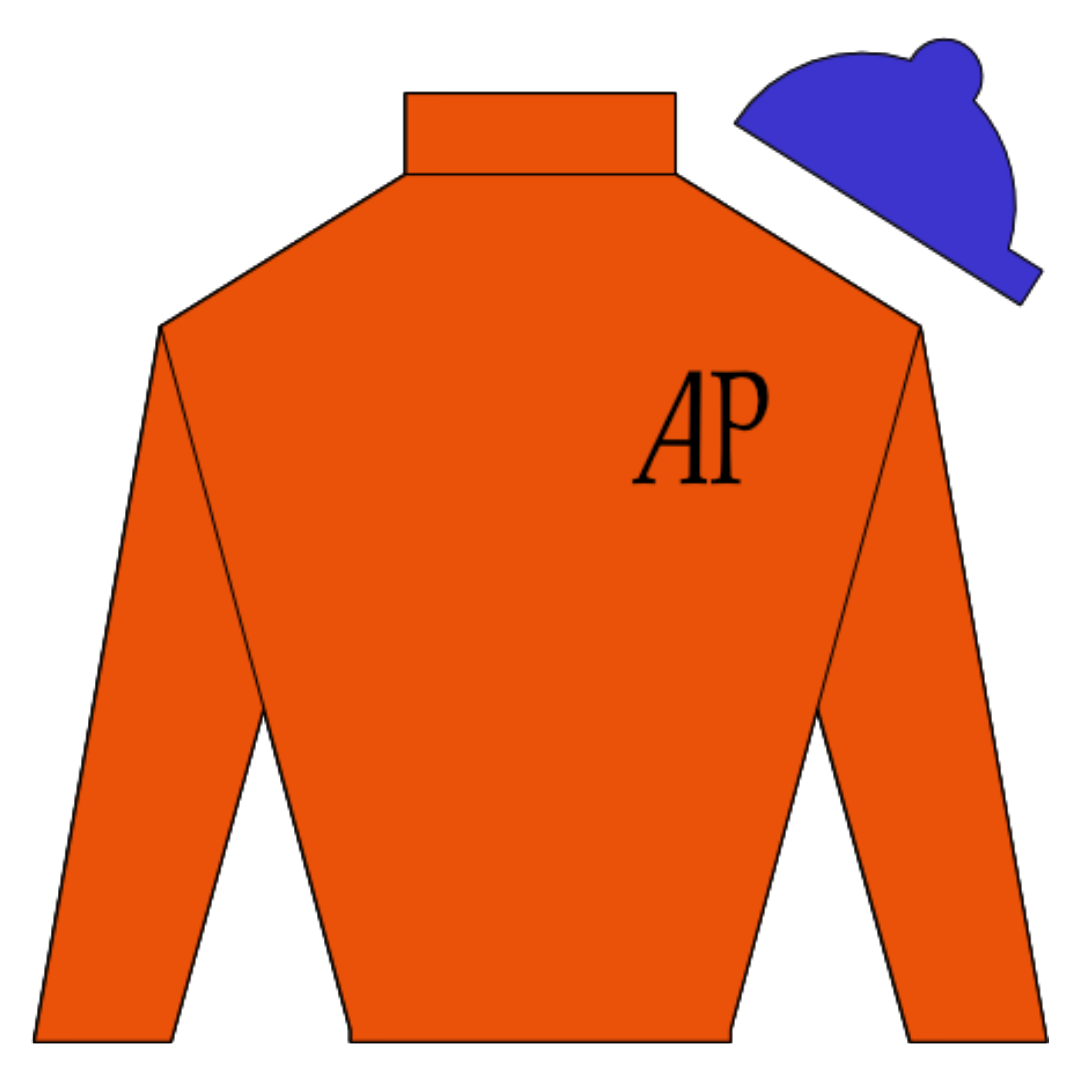
Artha 999 Janendra

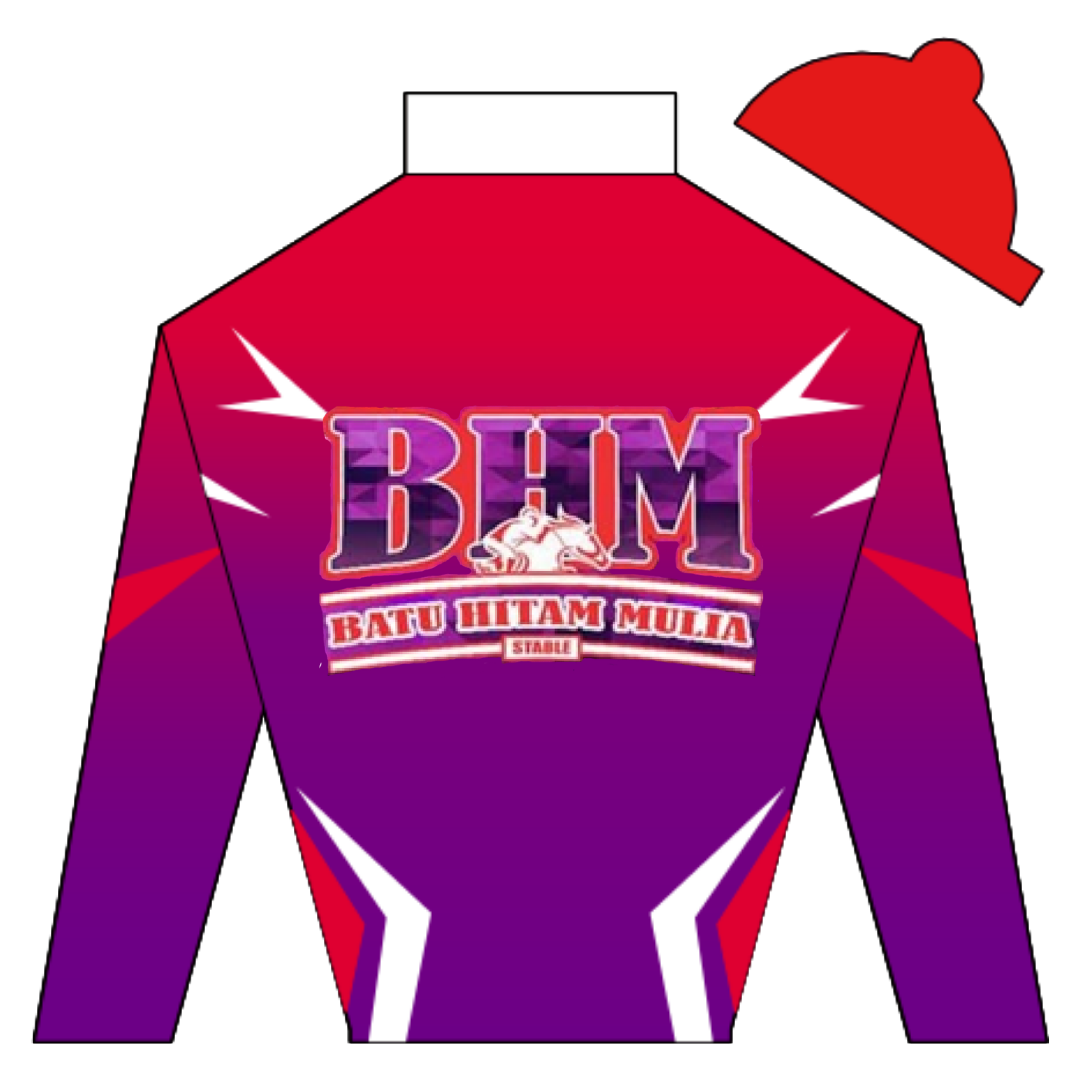
Sabitzer Nagari

The Indonesia Derby is a flat horse race in Indonesia held for three-year-old colts and fillies. It is run over a distance of 2,000 meters (approximately 1.25 miles or 10 furlongs), usually in late July or early August. It is part of the Indonesia's Horse Racing series.

It was first officially run by the Equestrian Association of Indonesia in 1972, and, under official regulations, is one of the two official classic races, along with the Indonesia Oaks (Pertiwi Cup). The Derby is also part of the first leg of the National Championships (Kejurnas) since 1975, followed by the Super Sprint and the Star of Stars in the second leg. Additionally, It is the final leg of the Indonesian Triple Crown (Indonesian: Piala Tiga Mahkota), preceded by the Triple Crown Series 1 over a distance of 1,200 meters and the Triple Crown Series 2 over a distance of 1,600 meters.

Thoroughbred horses are considered ineligible to run in the Indonesia Derby, as well as the other Indonesian classic races. Almost all of the participating racehorses are crossbreeds, although there were successful local sandel horses in the earlier decades. One notable example was in 1976 where Cempaka, a local horse from East Java, won the Indonesian Derby.

The Derby is the highest points-awarding race in the National Championships, with 16.5, 11, and 5.5 points awarded to the first, second, and third placed horses respectively. The provincial contingent with the most points in the National Championships are awarded the President of the Republic of Indonesia's Cup.

== History ==
=== Pre-Derby: the Soeharto Cup ===
In October 1966, the Equestrian Association of Indonesia (PORDASI) was inaugurated by the government as the sole parent organization for equestrianism in Indonesia, with General Suharto as its patron. In the same year, PORDASI carried out the first National Championship in Bogor. The event was an Open Class A race for the Soeharto Cup, which was a rolling trophy. The first edition was won by Diana which was owned by Suharto himself.

The Soeharto Cup continued on with a one race format up until 1974. In 1975, the National Championships format was changed to two legs, the first being the Indonesia Derby, and the second features several races classified by height. Since then, the Soeharto Cup was won by the most successful provincial contingent in both legs of the National Championships. After the fall of Suharto, the cup was renamed to the Bhayangkara Cup, and now the President of the Republic of Indonesia's Cup.

An equivalent to the Soeharto Cup in its single race format today would be the Star of Stars.

=== Indonesia Derby ===
The Indonesia Derby was first inaugurated in 1972. For the first three years of its existence, it existed alongside the Soeharto Cup. In 1972 and 1973, the race was open to any horse of any breed, including thoroughbreds. Ever since 1974 however, the race was exclusively for 3-year-old crossbreeds and locals. In 1975 and onwards, the Derby was part of the National Championships, and thus, before 1997, part of the Soeharto Cup.

In 1976 to 1978 the Indonesian Triple Crown was first held. Unlike the current format, the Indonesian Derby was the first race, and is followed by a 1200 and 1600 meter race held by PORDASI. The 1976 and 1977 featured double crown winners, which were Cempaka, a local breed, and Bayu Kartika. Both Cempaka and Bayu Kartika were successful in the first two races, but lost in the final 1600 meter race. The Triple Crown was eventually won by Mystere in 1978. His achievement however, is disputed and unrecognized by PORDASI, as the Triple Crown series was discontinued in 1979.

In 1981, the Indonesian government imposed a nationwide ban on gambling. Thus, the totalizator, as well as all gambling operations, were removed from Pulomas Racecourse. Ever since then, the horse racing industry declined in popularity and earnings.

The Derby changed in length several times during the New Order. From 1200 to 1400 meters in 1975, 1400 to 1600 meters in 1990, and 1600 to 1850 meters in 1995.

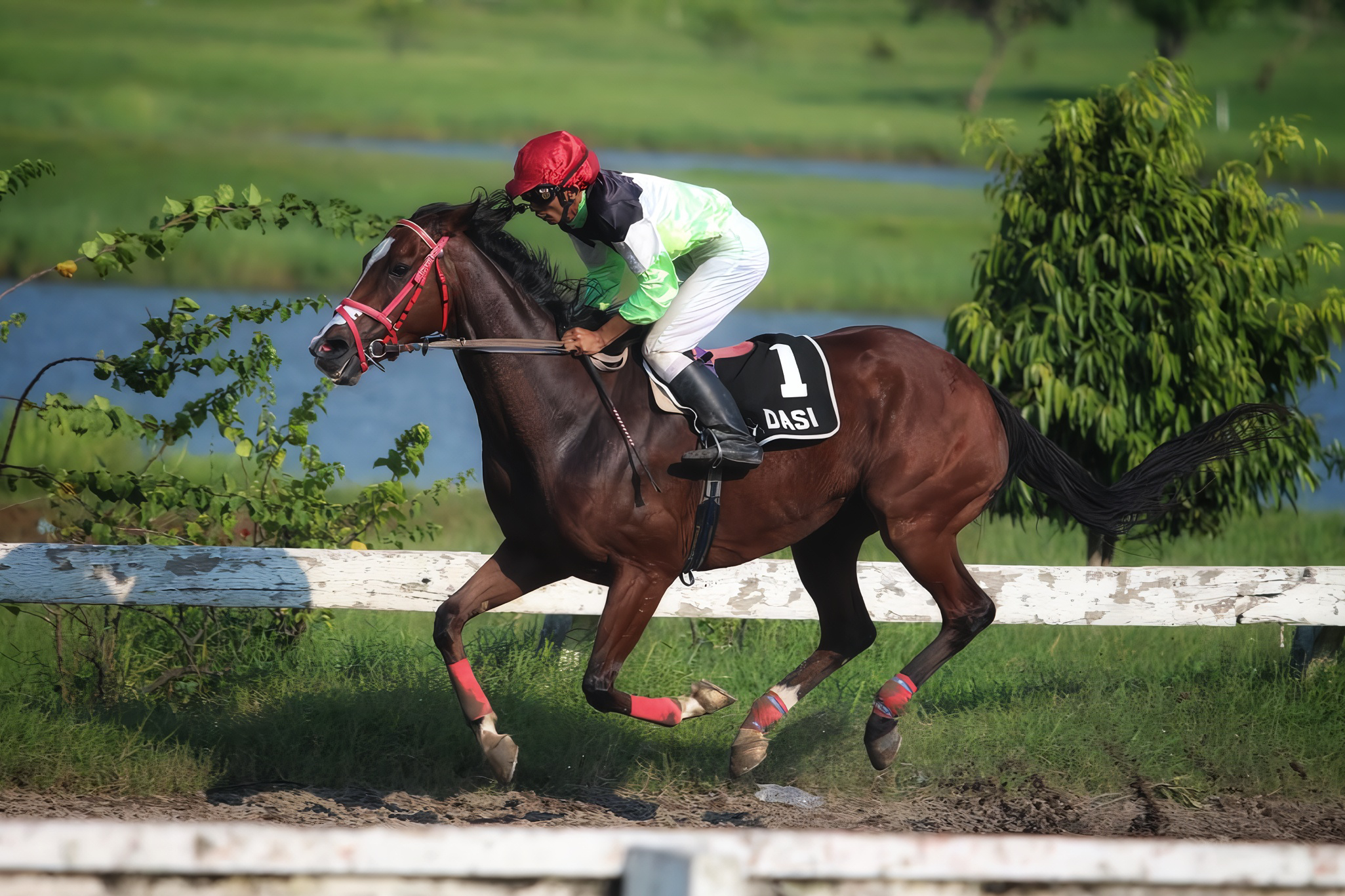
Djohar Manik (pictured in 2016), winner of the 2014 Indonesia Derby and the Triple Crown.

The Reformasi era, which is the ongoing era in Indonesia marked by the fall of Suharto, saw the revival of Triple Crown winners. In 2002 Manik Trisula won the Indonesia Derby to achieve the Triple Crown, and Djohar Manik did the same in 2014.

Despite the achievements of several racehorses, Indonesia's horse racing industry continued to plummet in both popularity and revenue in the 21st century. Pulomas Racecourse, Indonesia's flagship racecourse, gradually lost its prominence as facilities were neglected and damaged from floods. The venue was eventually closed in 2016 to make way for the Jakarta International Equestrian Park, an equestrian venue for the 18th Asian Games.

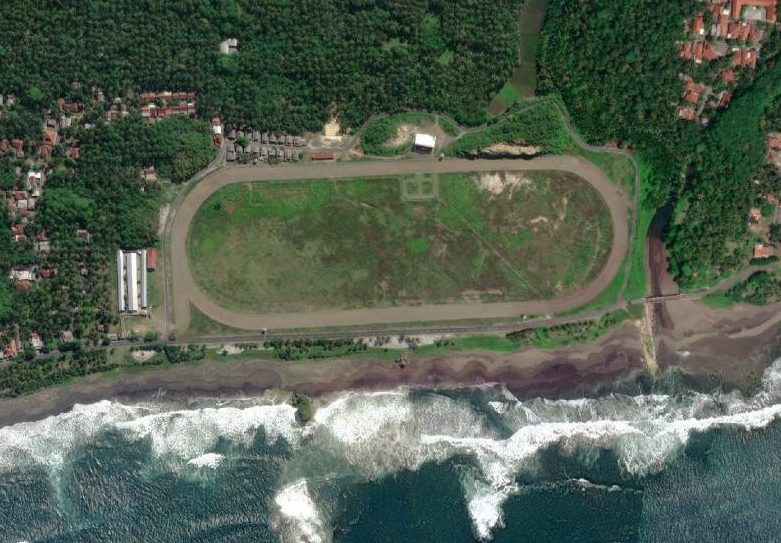
Legokjawa Racecourse, located on the coast of Pangandaran Regency, West Java, will be the venue for the 2026 Indonesia Derby.

For 39 years the Indonesia Derby had been held at the Pulomas Racecourse, and ever since its abolishment the Derby moved to Tegalwaton Racecourse, Central Java for four years until before the COVID-19 pandemic. After the pandemic, the event's racecourse changes every few years, depending on PORDASI's decision. The Derby was held at Legokjawa Racecourse, West Java in 2021, then Ki Ageng Astrojoyo Racecourse, East Java in 2022, then Kandih (Sawahlunto) Racecourse, West Sumatra, in 2023, then Sultan Agung Racecourse, DI Yogyakarta in 2024 and 2025. The upcoming 2026 Indonesia Derby is planned to be held at the Legokjawa Racecourse once more.

In 2023, horse racing promotors and organizers, SARGA.CO, was founded by now chairman of PORDASI, Aryo Djojohadikusumo. SARGA.CO collaborated with PORDASI to organize horse racing events, with the goal of rebuilding, developing, and popularizing Indonesian horse racing. Since 2025 SARGA.CO introduced the national calendar in the form of a racing circuit, Indonesia's Horse Racing. The Indonesia Derby, along with other national level races including the Triple Crown and the National Championships, is part of Indonesia's Horse Racing.

In 2025, King Argentin won the Indonesia Derby and achieved the Triple Crown.

== Qualification ==
=== Classification ===
Horses competing in the Indonesia Derby must meet several requirements in terms of breed, age, and height. As with most horse races in Indonesia, thoroughred horses are not allowed to compete. Only crossbreeds between thoroughbreds and local breeds (called G/KP), including the Kuda Pacu Indonesia, are qualified to race.

The Indonesia Derby is exclusive for horses in the Derby Class, which is a classification for three year old colts and fillies with a height of 156.1 cm or taller. Three year old horses under the height requirement are not eligible to compete in the 2000m Indonesia Derby, and compete in the Juvenile (Remaja) Class instead. Additionally, the additional weight carried by horses differ by sex, with colts carrying 51 kg and fillies carrying 50 kg based on national horse racing regulations.

Horse classifications for the Indonesia Derby.
	Classification	Notes
Breed	G/KP/Kuda Pacu Indonesia	-
Age	3-year-old	Birth dates are standardized to 1 August.
Height	Derby Class (≥156.1 cm)	Horses who had qualified for the Derby Class at least once cannot move down to the Juvenile Class despite latest measurements.

=== Preliminary races ===
There are no step races that give direct qualification for the Indonesia Derby. Instead, horses go through a preliminary round. The horses are drawn with consideration of their previous races results. Favorable major races include the previous two Triple Crown races, the Pertiwi Cup, as well as other pre-Derby races including, but not limited to, the Jateng Derby, the King Hamengkubuwono X Cup 3-year-old Derby race, the Sawahlunto Derby, and the previous year's Indonesia Derby 2-year-old Beginner A/B Class race.

The preliminary round, usually two weeks before the race, and are divided into two heats of ten to twelve horses. The top six horses in each heat qualify for the Indonesia Derby, with the seventh place horses becoming reserve racers. The horses that do not qualify for the Indonesia Derby compete in the Non-Finalist 3-year-old Derby race.

Preliminary races for the Indonesia Derby
No	Race name	Grade	Distance	Qualification
1	3-year-old Derby Heat I	Elimination	Dirt 2000m	Top 6
2	3-year-old Derby Heat II	Elimination	Dirt 2000m	Top 6

== Locations ==
Over the years the race has been held at the following racetracks:

Years	Racecourse	Times
1974	Ranomuut Racecourse	(1 time)
1975	Arcamanik Racecourse	(1 time)
1976 – 2015	Pulomas Racecourse	(39 times)
2016 – 2019	Tegalwaton Racecourse	(3 times)
2020	Not held due to COVID-19 pandemic	
2021, 2026	Legokjawa Racecourse	(2 times)
2022	Ki Ageng Astrojoyo Racecourse	(1 time)
2023	Kandih Racecourse	(1 time)
2024 – 2025	Sultan Agung Racecourse	(2 times)

== Records ==
Most wins by a jockey:

- 5 wins – Coen Singal (1988, 1990, 1999, 2000, 2004)
- 5 wins – Jemmy Runtu (2016, 2018, 2021, 2024, 2025)
- 3 wins – Welly Mewengkang (1982, 1985, 1997)
- 3 wins – Harny Pantouw (1981, 2005, 2010)
- 2 wins – Buce Pantouw 1976, 1978)
- 2 wins – J. Sumuweng (1984, 1992)
- 2 wins – Suwarno (1989, 1995)
- 2 wins – Ara Suhara (1987, 2002)
- 2 wins – Mecky Tewuh (1993, 2011)
- 2 wins – Hanny Suoth (1994, 2019)
- 2 wins – Falentino Sangian (2022, 2026)

Most wins by a trainer:

- 5 wins – Karlan (2018, 2019, 2021, 2024, 2025)
- 5 wins – Edwin Basuki (1988, 1990, 2000, 2005, 2014)
- 4 wins – Wahono A.T (1996, 1997, 1999, 2001)
- 3 wins – H. Ermy Bahar (2004, 2008, 2010)
- 2 wins – E. Lanujaya (1992, 1993)
- 2 wins – Martin Supit (1979, 1981)
- 2 wins – M. Udis (1989, 2013)

Most wins by an owner:

- 14 wins – Pamulang Stud & Stable (1976, 1978, 1980, 1982, 1991, 1992, 1993, 1995, 1996, 1997, 1999, 2001, 2002, 2008, 2010)
- 6 wins – King Halim Stable (2016, 2018, 2019, 2021, 2024, 2025)
- 3 wins – Dago Stable (1995, 2001, 2009)
- 2 wins – Aragon Stable (2003, 2014)
- 2 wins – Bendang Stable (2004, 2008)
- 2 wins – Totemboan Stable (1975, 1982)
- 2 wins – Ir. Jeane (1993, 1996)
- 2 wins – Albert "Abe" C.J Mantiri (1974, 1977)

== Winners ==
(Note on Indonesian words in the names; dh. indicates the former name of the horse.)

- Italic indicates filly
- **Bold** indicates Triple Crown winner

Year	Winner	Breed	Jockey	Trainer	Owner(s) (Stable)	Distance	Venue	Time	Ref.
(Open to all breeds)
1972	Sampani	Local	Memed		Atang Sobandi	1200 m			
1973	Jimmy	Foreign breed	Sukarya		Leidayasi	1200 m			
(3-years-old Derby Class)
1974	Priam dh. Mahesa Djenar	G1	Maxi Singal	Kabori	A.C.J. Mantiri Prihartono, SH.	1200 m	Ranomuut		
1975	Valencia	G1	Jori Lampus	H. Pandegirot	(Totemboan Stable)	1400 m	Arcamanik		
1976	Cempaka	Local	Buce Pantouw	Mas Slamet	(Pamulang Stud & Stable)	1400 m	Pulomas		
1977	Bayu Kartika	G1	Alo Turangan	Berth Supit	B. Mamahit	1400 m	Pulomas		
1978	**Mystere**	G1	Buce Pantouw	Abdullah S	(Pamulang Stud & Stable)	1400 m	Pulomas	1:36.4	
1979	Trisoela	G1	Jimmy Roring	Martin Supit	H. Subagyo	1400 m	Pulomas	1:33.6	
1980	Ken Ayu	G1	L. Rawis	Abdullah	(Pamulang Stud & Stable)	1400 m	Pulomas	1:31.2	
1981	Pejoeang	G2	Harny Pantouw	Martin Supit	Century Stable	1400 m	Pulomas	1:40.16	
1982	Leonardo dh. Sawangan	G2	Welly Mewengkang	G.A. Siwu	Tontemboan Stable	1400 m	Pulomas		
1983	Rio Bravo dh. Maha Putra	G2	Ary Rori	J. Frederik	Ny. M. Frederik	1400 m	Pulomas		
1984	Mawar Melati	G2	J. Sumuweng	A. Lanujaya	Mawar Merah Stable	1400 m	Pulomas		
1985	Liberty	G1	Welly Mewengkang	E. Darusman	Liberty Stable	1400 m	Pulomas		
1986	Putra Sulut	G2	Jemmy Roring	A. Supit	Jambat A. Damopolii	1400 m	Pulomas		
1987	Sari Pohaci dh. Selindo	G2	Ara Suhara	Mumuh	Hiswara Dharma Putera	1400 m	Pulomas	1:31.9	
1988	Galigo	G2	Coen Singal	Edwin Basuki	Dr. Achmad Rizal	1400 m	Pulomas	1:46.03	
1989	Putri Pajajaran	G3	Suwarno	M. Udis	Airspin Stable	1400 m	Pulomas		
1990	Big Ben	G2	Coen Singal	Edwin Basuki	Dr. Achmad Faizal	1600 m	Pulomas		
1991	Mulawarman	G3	E. Kosasih	B. Wowiling	Sonny Baksono, SH (Pamulang Stud & Stable)	1600 m	Pulomas	1:44.34	
1992	Ratu Adria	G3	J. Sumuweng	E. Lanujaya	Amris Hassan (Pamulang Stud & Stable)	1600 m	Pulomas		
1993	Roofcryl dh. Jaka Bandung	G3	Mecky Tewuh	E. Lanujaya	Ir. Jeane (Pamulang Stud & Stable)	1600 m	Pulomas	1:44.26	
1994	Robin Hood dh. Adios	G2	Hanny Suoth	H. Rori	Ny. Inne Karamoy	1600 m	Pulomas	1:41.87	
1995	Lucky Strike dh. Arya Timur	G3	Suwarno	E. Sukardi	Pamulang Stud & Stable; Dago Stable	1850 m	Pulomas	2:02	
1996	Lady Centavo	G3	Arie Rori	Wahono AT	Ir. Jeane (Pamulang Stud & Stable)	1850 m	Pulomas	1:58.85	
1997	Ratu Mayangkara	G4	Welly Mewengkang	Wahono AT	Pamulang Stud & Stable	1850 m	Pulomas	2:01.7	
1998	Permata Rajawali	G3	E. Sonitan	Iwan K	Faisal R.	1850 m	Pulomas	2:01.6	
1999	Nefertiti	G4	Coen Singal	Wahono AT	(Pamulang Stud & Stable)	1850 m	Pulomas	2:03.26	
2000	Indon	G4	Coen Singal	Edwin Basuki	Sukun Stable	2000 m	Pulomas	2:12.11	
2001	Ratu Nagari	G3	Fendy Nayoan	Wahono AT	Pamulang Stud & Stable; Dago Stable	2000 m	Pulomas	2:07.91	
2002	**Manik Trisula**	G3	Ara Suhara	Ir. Febrius Abu Bakar	Pamulang Stud & Stable; Trisa Yemita Febrius	2000 m	Pulomas	2:08.20	
2003	Dewi Millenia	G4	F. Sonitan	Iwan Kurniawan	Aragon Stable	2000 m	Pulomas	2:10.50	
2004	Wali Nagari dh. Nagamas	G4	Coen Singal	H. Ermy Bahar	Mario Bahar (Bendang Stable)	2000 m	Pulomas		
2005	Pesona Karunia	G4	Harny Pantouw	Edwin Basuki	Nikita Stable	2000 m	Pulomas	2:10.32	
2006	Exotica	G4	F. Lepah	Jori Lampus	Agam Tirto Buwono (SHRD Stable)	2000 m	Pulomas	2:09.21	
2007	Brave Heart	G4	T. Pantouw	Tony Rumambi	E.E. Mangindaan (Kharisma Stable)	2000 m	Pulomas	2:08.56	
2008	Pesona Nagari	G4	Stevi Tongkeles	H. Ermy Bahar	Pamulang Stud & Stable; Mario Bahar (Bendang Stable)	2000 m	Pulomas	2:08.71	
2009	Messa	G4	D. Suhendar	H. F. Saddak	Untung Joesoef (Dago Stable)	2000 m	Pulomas	2:10.97	
2010	Cahaya Nagari dh. Amandalu	KPI	Harny Pantouw	H. Ermy Bahar	Pamulang Stud & Stable; Mario Bahar (Bendang Stable)	2000 m	Pulomas	2:11.78	
2011	Gagah Tanjungsari	G4	Mecky Tewuh	A. Sukarya	Alex Asmasoebrata (Tanjungsari Stable)	2000 m	Pulomas	2:10.32	
2012	Tebaran Mega	G4	Meikel Soleran	Berry Sondak	Eclipse Stable	2000 m	Pulomas		
2013	Red Silenos dh. Master O' War	KP5	S. Dedi	M. Udis	Ahmad Hidayat Mus (Taliabo Stable)	2000 m	Pulomas		
2014	**Djohar Manik**	KP5	Jendri Turangan	Edwin Basuki	Aragon & Tombo Ati Stable	2000 m	Pulomas		
2015	Beauty Eagling	G4	Cun Pantouw	Sinyo Pantouw	H. Misbahul Munir (Rasya Stable)	2000 m	Pulomas		
2016	Dragon Runner	KP5	Jemmy Runtu	Coen Singal	King Halim Stable	2000 m	Tegalwaton	2:11:92	
2017	Kamang Chrome dh. Guntur Sumbar	KP5	Tripan Eri	Tuan Amris	Ramlan Nurmatias (Emeral Stable)	2000 m	Tegalwaton	2:10:70	
2018	Lady Aria	KP5	Jemmy Runtu	Karlan	King Halim Stable	2000 m	Tegalwaton		
2019	Cinderella Jatim	KP5	Hanny Suoth	Karlan	King Halim Stable	2000 m	Tegalwaton		
2020	Cancelled due to the COVID-19 pandemic								
2021	Lady Jay	G4	Jemmy Runtu	Karlan	King Halim Stable	2000 m	Legokjawa		
2022	Lyana Nagari	KP5	Falentino Sangian	Mario Bahar	Olly Dondokambey	2000 m	Ki Ageng Astrojoyo		
2023	Bintang Maja	KP5	Ended Rahmat	Dani Setiawan	H. Obeng Sobari (Jalu Stable)	2000 m	Kandih		
2024	Rapid Dash	G4	Jemmy Runtu	Karlan	King Halim Stable; Blue Ocean Stable	2000 m	Sultan Agung		
2025	**King Argentin**	KP6	Jemmy Runtu	Karlan; Farooq Ali Khan	Kusnadi Halim (King Halim Stable)	2000 m	Sultan Agung	2:16.57	
2026	Zilong Rimboka dh. Sunshield Nagari	KP5	Falentino Sangian	Ruly Soleran	Natalia Roring (Rimboka Stable)	2000 m	Legokjawa		

== Gallery ==
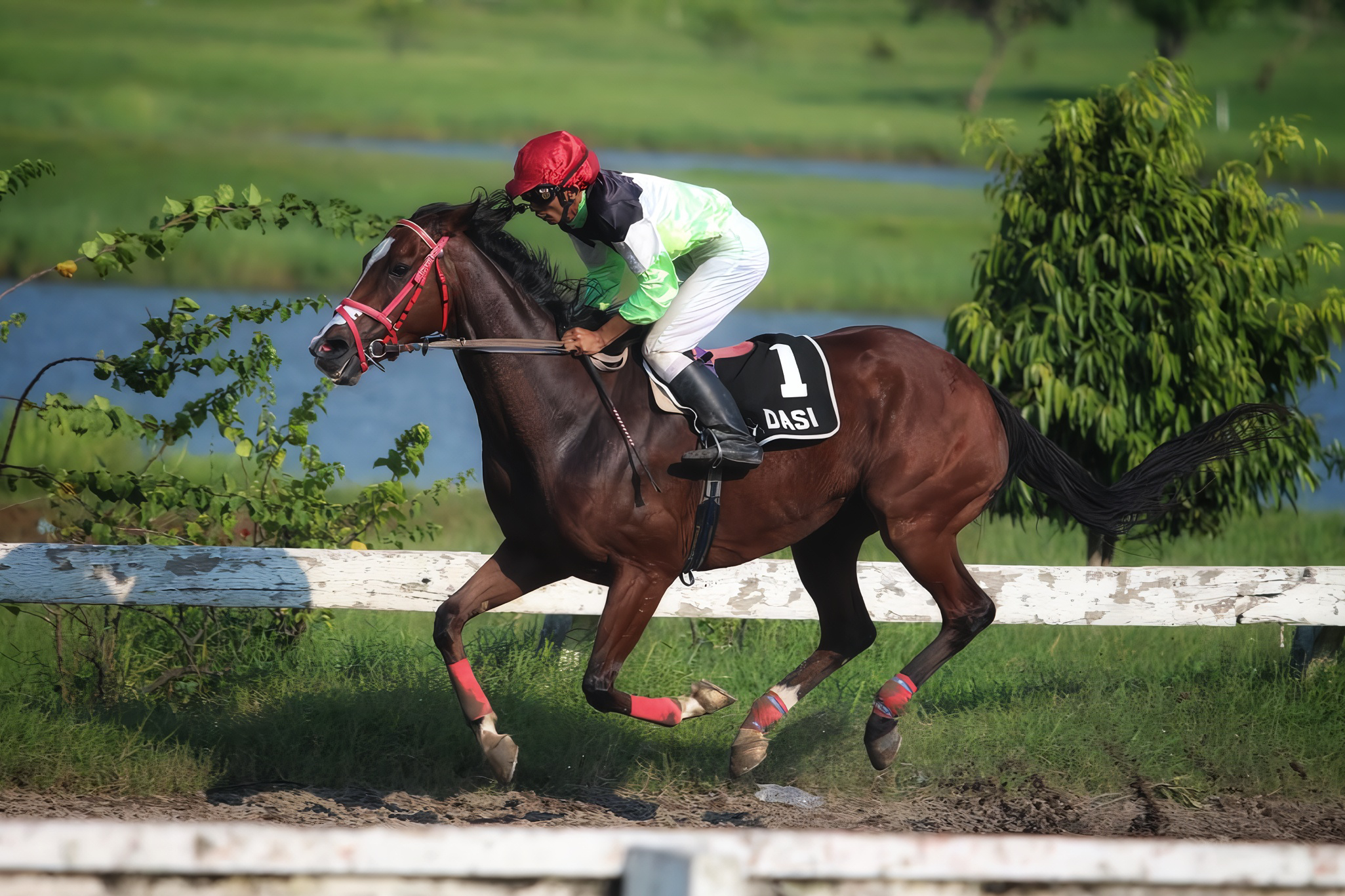
Djohar Manik

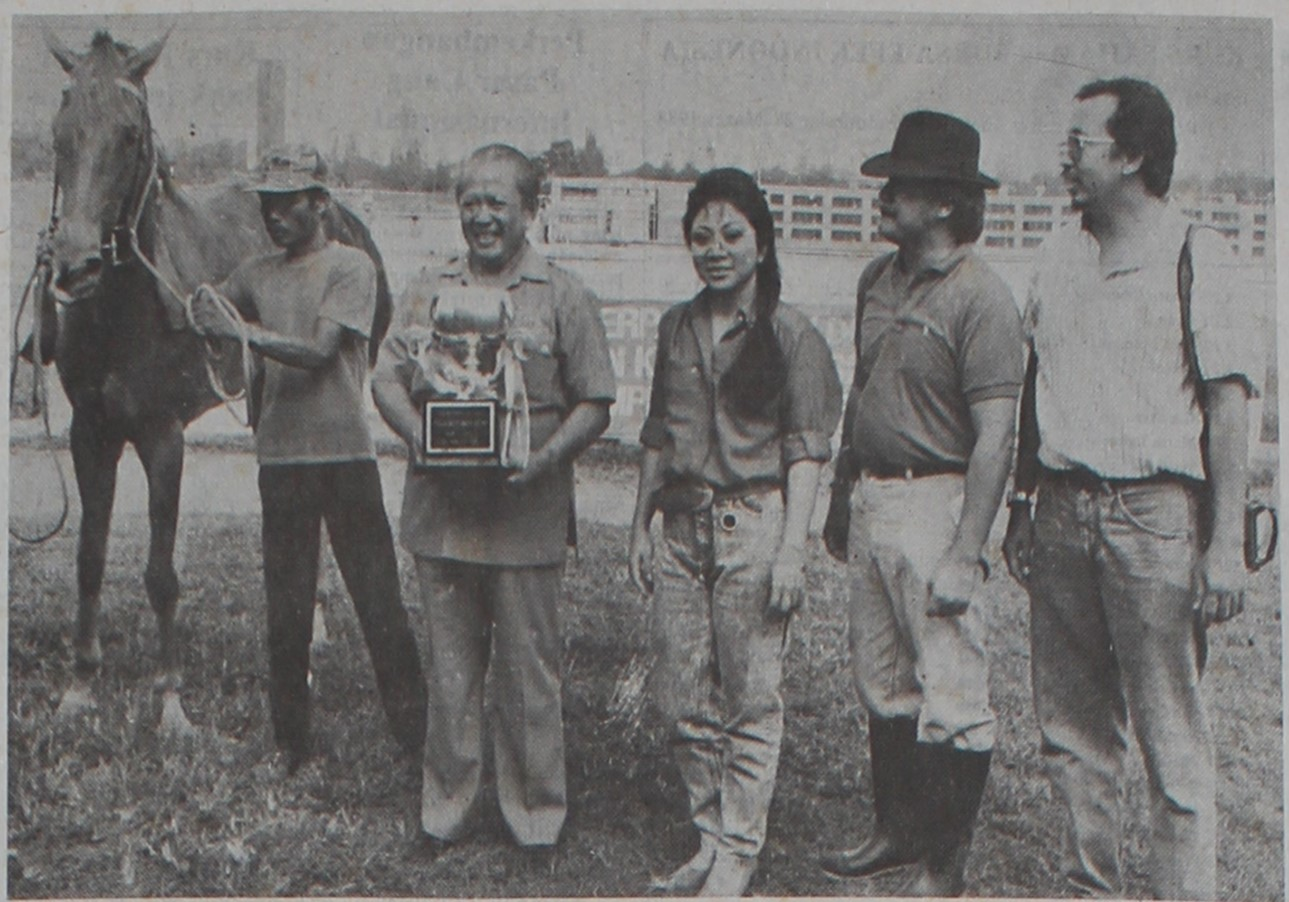
Sari Pohaci

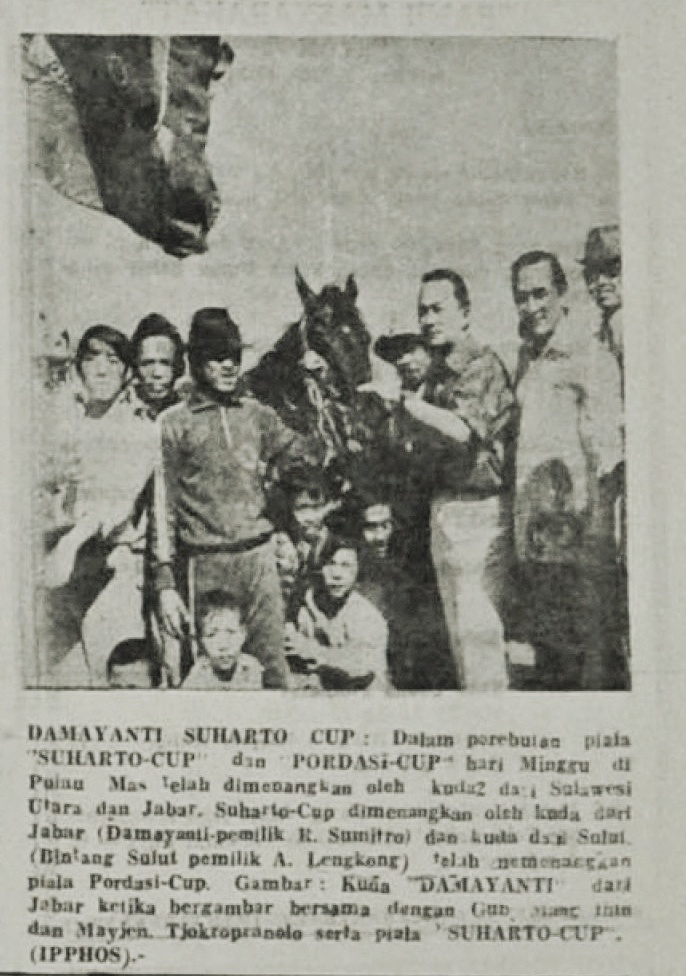
Damayanti

== See also ==
- Horse racing in Indonesia
- Indonesia's Horse Racing (horse racing series)
- Kejurnas Pacuan Kuda PORDASI (National Championships)
- Pertiwi Cup (horse race) (Indonesia Oaks)
- Indonesian Triple Crown
- List of racehorses
