= Valencia (horse) =

Indonesian racehorse

- Breed: G1 (Pordasi classification)
- Sire: Keen Court (AUS)
- Grandsire: Sostenuto (ITY)
- Dam: Bintang Putri (LK MIN)
- Damsire: Lambretta (LN IND)
- Sex: Mare
- Foaled: November 9, 1971
- Country: Indonesia
- Colour: Gray (Kelabu or Dawuk)
- Breeder: Albert "Abe" C.J. Mantiri
- Owner: Totemboan Stable
- Trainer: H. Pandeirot
- Jockey: Jori Lampus

Major wins
- Indonesia Derby (1975 )

Valencia (foaled November 9, 1971) was an Indonesian racehorse. Her major win at national race was in the 1975 Indonesia Derby.

== Background ==
Valencia was a gray mare foaled on November 9, 1971, by Albert "Abe" C.J. Mantiri. Her sire is Keen Court (AUS Thoroughbred), a son of Sostenuto (ITY Thoroughbred), and her dam is Bintang Putri (Minahasa breed), a daughter of Lambretta (imported non-Thoroughbred horse). Valencia breed was classified as G1 (Generasi ke-1) based on the Pordasi classification, with a proportion of Thoroughbred genetic material of 50%.

Valencia owner was Totemboan Stable, with trainer H. Pandeirot. Valencia represents the DKI Jakarta contingent.

== Racing career ==
Initially, Valencia's abilities were doubted because of her gray color (or dawuk in Indonesia). Jori Lampus, her jockey, was teased for being paired with her.

During the 1975 Indonesia Derby in Arcamanik, Valencia faced 9 horses. As the horses were warming up and then being escorted to the starting gate, Jori spotted a group of children playing on the track before being turned away by security. When the race began, the horses raced at full speed. But Valencia could not get out of the gate, allegedly due to an obstruction. Despite this, she managed to break through the gate and catch up with her opponents.

From 1000 M to 800 M, Jori and Valencia ran in the middle, not daring to join the group or jump straight to the front. Also in front was a horse from East Java, Glory, running in a zigzag pattern.

800 M to the finish, Valencia began to overtake and pass his opponents one by one, also passing Glory, until finally reaching the front position at the finish and winning the Indonesia Derby.

=== Race record ===
Date	Racecourse	Race	Class	Distance	Entry	HN	Finished	Time	Jockey	Winner (Runner-up)	Ref.
Sep 28, 1975	Arcamanik	Indonesia Derby	Derby	1,400 M	9	1	1st		Jori Lampus	(–)	

== Pedigree ==
Pedigree of Valencia (IDN), gray mare, foaled 1971
Sire Keen Court (AUS)	Sostenuto (ITY)	Never Say Die (USA)	Nasrullah (GB)
Sire Keen Court (AUS)	Sostenuto (ITY)	Never Say Die (USA)	Singing Grass (USA)
Sire Keen Court (AUS)	Sostenuto (ITY)	Arietta (GB)	Tudor Minstrel (GB)
Sire Keen Court (AUS)	Sostenuto (ITY)	Arietta (GB)	Anne of Essex (IRE)
Sire Keen Court (AUS)	Manzana (AUS)	Newtown Wonder (GB)	Fair Trial (GB)
Sire Keen Court (AUS)	Manzana (AUS)	Newtown Wonder (GB)	Clarapple (FR)
Sire Keen Court (AUS)	Manzana (AUS)	Moni Koura (AUS)	Golden Sovereign (IRE)
Sire Keen Court (AUS)	Manzana (AUS)	Moni Koura (AUS)	Miss Cygnea (AUS)
Dam Bintang Putri (LK MIN)	Lambretta (LN IND)	?	?
Dam Bintang Putri (LK MIN)	Lambretta (LN IND)	?	?
Dam Bintang Putri (LK MIN)	Lambretta (LN IND)	?	?
Dam Bintang Putri (LK MIN)	Lambretta (LN IND)	?	?
Dam Bintang Putri (LK MIN)	Presto (LK MIN)	Atom (LK MIN)	?
Dam Bintang Putri (LK MIN)	Presto (LK MIN)	Atom (LK MIN)	?
Dam Bintang Putri (LK MIN)	Presto (LK MIN)	?	?
Dam Bintang Putri (LK MIN)	Presto (LK MIN)	?	?

Note: LK: Local breed; LN: imported non-Thoroughbred horses
