= Mystere (horse) =

Indonesian racehorse

- Breed: G1 (PORDASI classification)
- Sire: Rico Rio
- Grandsire: Todman
- Dam: Saptadewi
- Damsire: Dark Chevallier
- Sex: Horse
- Foaled: 26 November 1974
- Country: Indonesia
- Colour: Bay (Jragem)
- Breeder: Pamulang Stable
- Owner: Pamulang Stable
- Trainer: Abdullah S.
- Jockey: Boetje Pantouw

Major wins
- Indonesia Derby (1978); Piala Pordasi Series I (1978); Piala Pordasi Series II (1978)

Awards
- Indonesian Triple Crown (1978)

Mystere (foaled 26 November, 1974 in Tangerang, Banten) was an Indonesian racehorse. In 1978, Mystere won the Indonesian Triple Crown, making him the first horse to achieve this title in the history of horse racing in Indonesia.

== Background ==
Mystere was a bay horse foaled on 26 November, 1974 at Pamulang Stud & Stable in Tangerang, Banten. His sire is Rico Rio (THB AUS), a son of Todman (THB AUS), and his dam is Saptadewi (Priangan breed), a daughter of Dark Chevallier. Mystere breed was classified as G1 (Generasi ke-1) based on the Pordasi classification, with a proportion of Thoroughbred genetic material of 50%.

Mystere was owned by Pamulang Stud & Stable, with trainer Abdullah S., and usually ridden by jockey Boetje Pantouw. During his racing career, he represented the DKI Jakarta contingent.

== Racing career ==
=== Racing form ===
Date	Racecourse	Race	Class	Distance	Entry	HN	Finished	Time	Jockey	Winner (Runner-up)	Ref.
May 21, 1978	Pulomas	Indonesia Derby	Derby	1400m	6	3	1st	1:36.4	Boetje Pantouw	(Kekar)	
Jun 4, 1978	Pulomas	Piala Pordasi (TC Series I)	Open	1200m			1st	1:21.6	Boetje Pantouw		
Jul 9, 1978	Pulomas	Piala Pordasi (TC Series II)	Open	1600m			1st		Boetje Pantouw		

== Pedigree ==
Pedigree of Mystere (IDN), bay horse, 1974
Sire Rico Rio (AUS)	Todman (AUS)	Star Kingdom (IRE)	Stardust (GB)
Sire Rico Rio (AUS)	Todman (AUS)	Star Kingdom (IRE)	Impromptu (IRE)
Sire Rico Rio (AUS)	Todman (AUS)	Oceana (AUS)	Colombo (GB)
Sire Rico Rio (AUS)	Todman (AUS)	Oceana (AUS)	Orama (GB)
Sire Rico Rio (AUS)	Grande Brio (AUS)	Flying Missel (USA)	Equestrian (USA)
Sire Rico Rio (AUS)	Grande Brio (AUS)	Flying Missel (USA)	Momentum (USA)
Sire Rico Rio (AUS)	Grande Brio (AUS)	Fair Helen (AUS)	Ajax (FR)
Sire Rico Rio (AUS)	Grande Brio (AUS)	Fair Helen (AUS)	Anne-Tien-Et (AUS)
Dam Saptadewi (IDN)	Dark Chevallier (AUS)	–	–
Dam Saptadewi (IDN)	Dark Chevallier (AUS)	–	–
Dam Saptadewi (IDN)	Dark Chevallier (AUS)	–	–
Dam Saptadewi (IDN)	Dark Chevallier (AUS)	–	–
Dam Saptadewi (IDN)	Saptawindon (IDN)	–	–
Dam Saptadewi (IDN)	Saptawindon (IDN)	–	–
Dam Saptadewi (IDN)	Saptawindon (IDN)	–	–
Dam Saptadewi (IDN)	Saptawindon (IDN)	–	–

== Sources ==
- Soehardjono, Oetari (1990). Kuda. Pamulang: Yayasan Pamulang Equestrian Centre. ISBN 9798196007.
- Soehadji; Muladno; Bandiati, Sri; Soekotjo, Wirasmono; Soehardjono, Oetari (2019). Sejarah Pembentukan Kuda Pacu Indonesia: Rumpun Baru Kuda Indonesia Karya Anak Bangsa. Jakarta: Gramedia Pustaka Utama. ISBN 9786020622446.
