= Cempaka (horse) =

Indonesian racehorse

- Breed: Local breed
- Sire: Boy Blimbing (LN AUS)
- Dam: Melati (LK Jatim)
- Damsire: Boy Bintang (LN AUS)
- Sex: Filly
- Foaled: January 12, 1972
- Country: Indonesia
- Colour: Bay (Jragem)
- Breeder: Pamulang Stud & Stable
- Owner: Ny. Oetari Soehardjono
- Trainer: Mas Slamet
- Jockey: Buce Pantouw

Major wins
- Indonesia Derby (1976); Piala Pordasi Series I / 2nd Leg TC (1976)

Cempaka (formerly known as Tjempaka, January 12, 1972 – ?) is an Indonesian racehorse. Her major win at national race was in the 1976 Indonesia Derby and Piala Pordasi Series I. She is the only local breed horse to win the Derby.

== Background ==
Cempaka is a bay filly foaled on 1972, at Pamulang Stud & Stable in Tangerang, Banten. Her sire is Boy Blimbing (non-Thoroughbred from Australian), and her dam is Melati (Java breed/Jatim).

Cempaka represents the DKI Jakarta contingent.

== Racing career ==
Cempaka is the only locally bred horse to win the Indonesia Derby, a time when most other winning horses were Thoroughbred-mixed horses. In the 1976 Indonesia Derby, Cempaka was ridden by jockey B. Pantow and trainer Mas Slamet.

After winning the Derby, Cempaka continued his career by winning the Piala Pordasi Series I which was also the second leg of the Indonesian Triple Crown.

=== Race record ===
Date	Racecourse	Race	Class	Distance	Entry	HN	Finished	Time	Jockey	Winner (Runner-up)	Ref.
Jun 18, 1976	Pulomas	Indonesia Derby	Derby	1400m			1st	1:38.3	Boetje Pantouw	(–)	
Aug 22, 1976	Pulomas	Piala Pordasi Series I / 2nd Leg Triple Crown	Open	1600m			1st	1:54.7	Boetje Pantouw	(–)	
