= Indonesian Triple Crown =

Horse racing in Indonesia

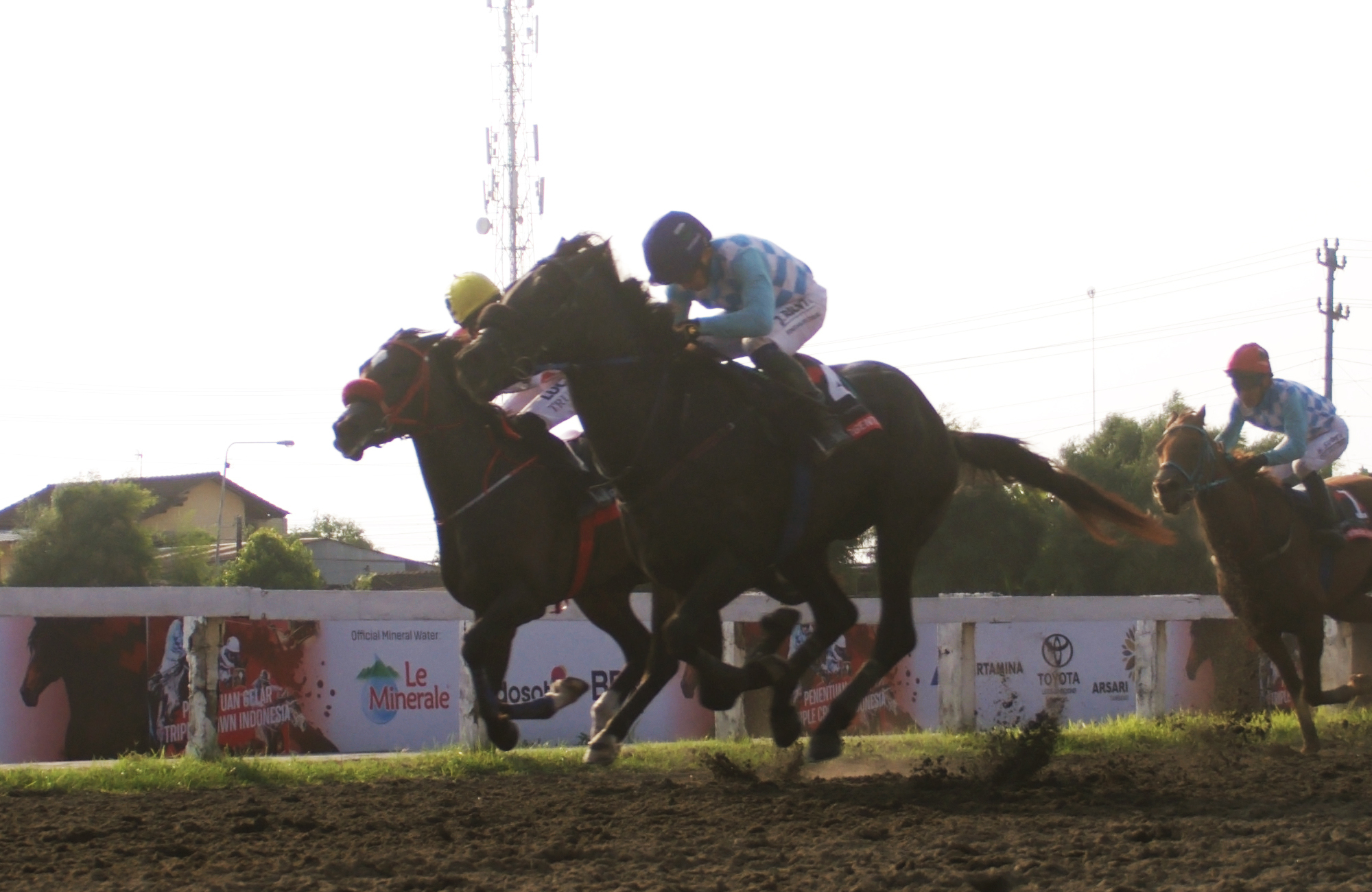
- King Argentin, the fourth Triple Crown Winner Indonesia, 2025
- Location: Indonesia
- Inaugurated: 1974; 52 years ago; 2002; 24 years ago (reinstatement)
- Race type: Flat racing (Triple Crown race series)
- Sponsor: Equestrian Association of Indonesia

Race information
- Distance: 1200m (0 3/4 miles); 1600m (1 miles); 2000m (1 2/5 miles)
- Surface: Dirt
- Qualification: 3-year-olds above B-class height

The Indonesian Triple Crown Series (Indonesian: Piala Tiga Mahkota) is a series of three horse races sanctioned by the Equestrian Association of Indonesia (PORDASI), the governing body of equestrianism in Indonesia. The three races are the Indonesia Derby and the Tiga Mahkota (translated into English as "Triple Crown") Series 1 and Series 2. The races, like most in Indonesia, are run on dirt. Horses who finish first in all three races in a season are recognized as Triple Crown Champions. The races are traditionally ran from March until early August of each year, although some events have resulted in schedule adjustments, such as in 2020, where only the first leg was held due to COVID-19 regulations in Indonesia. The triple crown races are considered the most prestigious races in the country, along with the Kejurnas series, Super Sprint and Star of Stars.

Four horses have won the Indonesian Triple Crown since its inauguration in 1974: Mystere (1978), (Note: Largely uncited due to the discontinuation of the Indonesia Triple Crown from 1979.) Manik Trisula (2002), Djohar Manik (2014), and King Argentin (2025).

== Background ==
The Indonesia Triple Crown is a part of the first Kejurnas (Kejuaraan Nasional National Championship) Series. As like in other countries, a horse must win three consecutive races to win the Triple Crown. In Indonesia, a horse must win three consecutive races, the Triple Crown Series 1 over a distance of 1,200 meters (0 3/4 miles) and Triple Crown Series 2 over a distance of 1,600 meters (1 miles) and Indonesia Derby over a distance of 2.000 meters (1 2/5 miles). Unlike other Triple Crown races outside of Indonesia, Thoroughbreds are considered ineligible to run in the Indonesian Triple Crown.

Mystere achieved his title as the first Triple Crown Winner after winning all the legs of the Indonesian Triple Crown (the 1st leg on May 21, 1977, then 2nd on July 4, 1977, and the Indonesia Derby on July 9, 1977). However, the Triple Crown title's designation was discontinued not long after in 1979 for undisclosed reason.

In 2002, Manik Trisula became the second horse and the first filly to win the Indonesian Triple Crown, marking the end of a 25-year hiatus.

Since then no horse has won the Triple Crown until 2014, Djohar Manik achieved her title after winning all three legs of the Indonesian Triple Crown (1st leg on March 23, 2014, 2nd leg on May 18, 2014, and the Indonesia Derby on July 20, 2014) at Pulomas Racecourse.

In 2025, after a long wait of 11 years, King Argentin achieved a historic milestone by winning all three legs of the Indonesian Triple Crown (1st leg on April 20, 2025, 2nd leg on May 18, 2025, and the Indonesia Derby on July 27, 2025, at the Sultan Agung Racecourse) becoming the fourth horse to accomplish the feat after an 11-year absence of a winner.

== Records ==
=== Winners ===
Triple Crown winners
Year	Winner	Jockey	Trainer	Owner	Breeder
1978	Mystere	Buce Pantouw	Abdullah S. H. A. Slamet	Pamulang Stud & Stable	Pamulang Stud & Stable
2002	Manik Trisula^{♥}	Ara Suhara	Ir. Febrius Abu Bakar	Pamulang Stud & Stable; Trisa Yemita Febrius	Pamulang Stud & Stable
2014	Djohar Manik^{♥}	Jendri Turangan	Edwin Basuki	Aragon & Tombo Ati Stable	Lala Stable
2025	King Argentin	Jemmy Runtu	Karlan; Farooq Ali Khan	Kusnadi Halim	King Halim Stable

Even though the horse that won the Triple Crown was a filly/mare, she will still be considered a Triple Crown winner, not a Triple Tiara winner. This is because there is no racing series in Indonesia for the Triple Tiara.

- ^{♥} indicates filly/mare

=== Double Crown winners ===
Racehorses which have won a "Double Crown" (two of the three races in the Indonesian Triple Crown) include:

Indonesian Double Crown series race winners
Year	Winners			Ref.
Year	1st leg	2nd leg	3rd leg	Ref.
1976	Cempaka^{♥}		Pringgondani^{♥}	
1977	Bayu Kartika^{♥}		Caudillo	
2006	King Master		Exotica^{♥}	
2008	Spirit Sikumbang	Pesona Nagari^{♥}		
2015	King Runny Star		Beauty Eagling^{♥}	
2016	Nara Asmara^{♥}		Dragon Runner	
2018	Lady Aria^{♥}	Gagak Lumayung	Lady Aria^{♥}	
2019	Cinderella Jatim^{♥}	Pesona Indah	Cinderella Jatim^{♥}	
2023	Ratu Aquila^{♥}	Bintang Maja		

Notes

- ^{♥} indicates filly/mare

== See also ==
- Horse racing in Indonesia
- Triple Crown of Thoroughbred Racing
