= King Argentin =

Indonesian racehorse (foaled 2021)

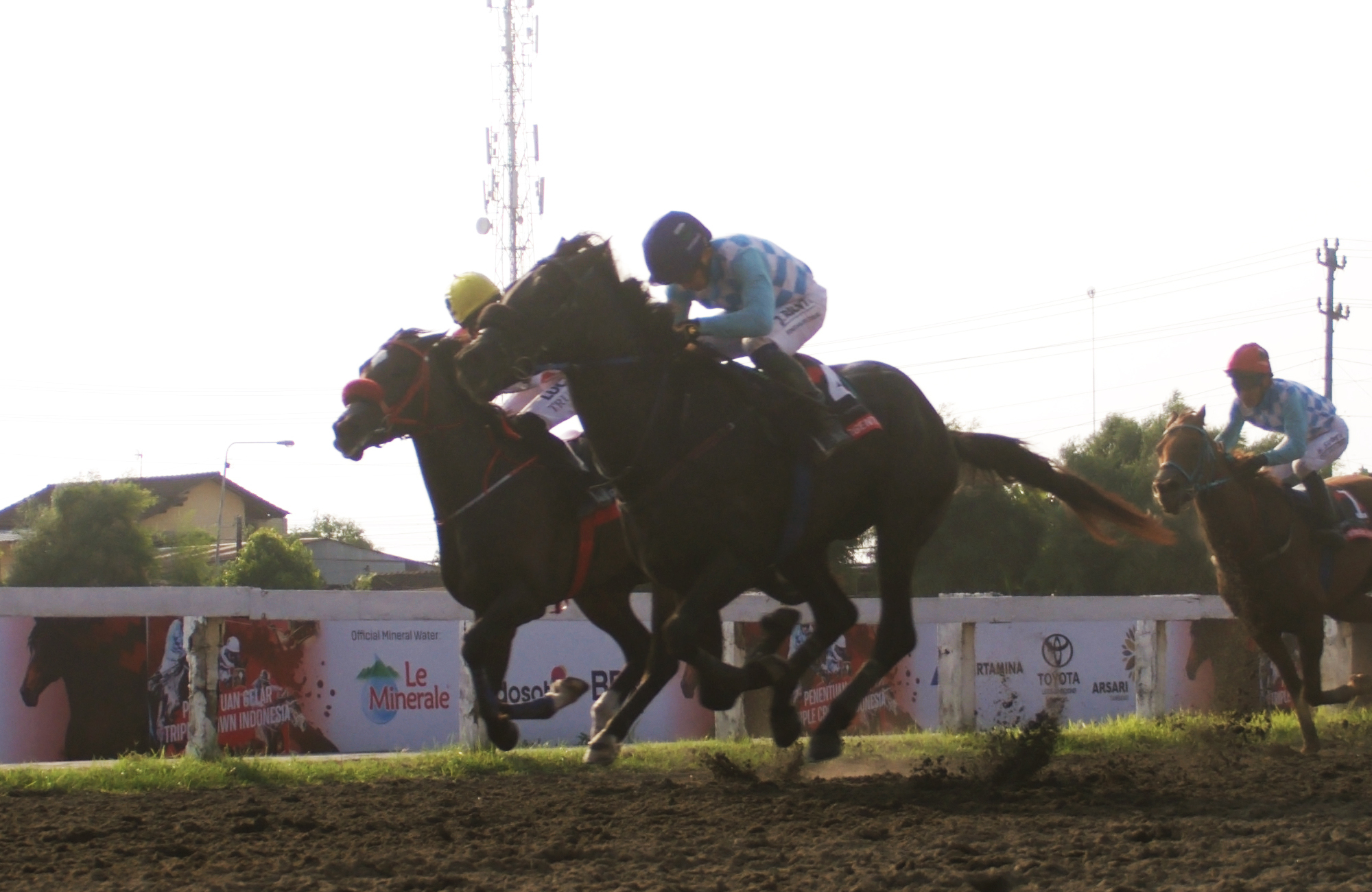
- King Argentin (no. 4) at the 2025 Indonesia Derby
- Breed: KP6 (PORDASI classification)
- Sire: Agrippa
- Grandsire: Almuinjjid
- Dam: Princess Missoni
- Damsire: Long War
- Sex: Colt
- Foaled: 25 August 2021 (age 4)
- Country: Indonesia
- Colour: Bay (Jragem)
- Breeder: King Halim Stable
- Owner: Kusnadi Halim
- Trainer: Karlan; Farooq Ali Khan
- Jockey: Hanny Suoth; Ahmad Fauzi; Jemmy Runtu
- Record: 9: 5-2-1
- Earnings: ?

Major wins
- A. E. Kawilarang Memorial (2025); Triple Crown Series 1 (2025); Triple Crown Series 2 (2025); Indonesia Derby (2025)

Awards
- Indonesian Triple Crown (2025); Indonesian Best Horse (2025)
- Last updated on 12 October 2025

King Argentin (born 25 August 2021, in Ledug, Tretes; sometimes erroneously spelled King Argentine) is an active Indonesian racehorse. In 2025, King Argentin won the Indonesian Triple Crown, becoming the fourth horse to do so after Mystere (1978), (Note: Largely uncited due to the discontinuation of Indonesia Triple Crown from 1979.) Manik Trisula (2002), and Djohar Manik (2014).

== Background ==
King Argentin is a bay horse who was bred in Indonesia by King Halim Stable. He was foaled on 25 August 2021, in Ledug, Tretes, Pasuruan Regency, East Java. Sired by Agrippa, a son of Almuinjjid, out of Princess Misoni, a daughter of Long War, he is related to the champion Japanese racehorse T. M. Opera O through his sire's grandsire, Blushing Groom, and is a descendant of Secretariat.

He is currently trained by Farooq Ali Khan and regularly ridden by Jemmy Runtu.

=== Breed ===
King Argentin, like most Indonesian racehorses, is not a thoroughbred, but instead a crossbreed between Thoroughbreds and native Sandalwood ponies. King Argentin, being a KP6, is the result of six generations of backcrossing between a Thoroughbred sire with a local dam.

== Racing career ==
=== 2024: two-year-old season ===
In April 2024, King Argentin debuted at Sultan Agung Racecourse in Bantul, Special Region of Yogyakarta, competing in the 800-meter sprint Class A/B race at the Piala Tiga Mahkota Seri 1 as a two-year-old colt. Though foaled in Pasuruan, East Java, he frequently represents West Java in competition.

=== 2025: three-year-old season ===
In the 2025 Jateng Derby, King Argentin crossed the finish line first in the 1,600-meter division. However, during the race, there was an incident involving his rival Milord, a top contender from North Sulawesi, where he collided with Salvator Minang, a contender from West Sumatra, resulting in a tragic accident where both horses died. Following the incident, the race committee declared the 1,600-meter division void, ruling that there would be no winner.

After winning the first two legs of the Indonesian Triple Crown Series in 2025, King Argentin entered the Indonesia Derby with the chance of becoming the nation's fourth Triple Crown winner. Several recent contenders, including Queen Thalassa in 2019 and Bintang Maja in 2023, had failed to complete the series. In the history of Indonesian horseracing, only three horses had previously secured the title: Mystere in 1978, Manik Trisula in 2002, and Djohar Manik in 2014. King Argentin won the Indonesia Derby, thereby completing the Triple Crown and becoming the first horse to do so in 11 years.

In January 2026, King Argentin was awarded the Indonesian Best Horse 2025 award at SARGA Indonesia's Horse Racing Award 2025.

=== Racing form ===
The data below are mostly based on information available on livestreams from the YouTube channel of Sarga. Co, the main company that organizes and manages professional horseracing tournaments in Indonesia.

Date	Racecourse	Race	Class	Distance	Entry	HN	Finished	Time	Jockey	Winner (Runner-up)	Ref.
2024 – two-year-old season
28 April 2024	Sultan Agung	Tiga Mahkota Series 1	2yo Maiden A/B	800m	9	6	1st		Hanny Suoth	(Agatha Star)	
02 June 2024	Tegalwaton	Tiga Mahkota Series 2	2yo Junior A/B	1200m	8	2	2nd		Hanny Suoth	Caraxes Nagari	
28 July 2024	Sultan Agung	Kejurnas Series 1	2yo Junior A/B	1400m	12	1	3rd		Hanny Suoth	Wonder Land	
2024 – three-year-old season
15 December 2024	Tegalwaton	Piala Ketum PP Pordasi 2024-2028	3yo Derby Div. I	1600m	9	1	2nd		Ahmad Fauzi	Milord	
12 January 2025	Tegalwaton	A. E. Kawilarang Memorial	3yo Derby	1600m	6	1	1st		Jemmy Runtu	（Equinox）	
16 February 2025	Tegalwaton	Jateng Derby	3yo Derby Div. I	1600m	11	3	– (Note: Win voided due to accident between Milord and Salvator Minang.)		Jemmy Runtu	(Wonder Land)	
20 April 2025	Sultan Agung	Triple Crown Series 1	3yo Derby	1200m	12	1	1st		Jemmy Runtu	(Wonder Land）	
18 May 2025	Tegalwaton	Triple Crown Series 2	3yo Derby	1600m	12	1	1st		Jemmy Runtu	(Wonder Land）	
27 July 2025	Sultan Agung	Indonesia Derby	3yo Derby	2000m	12	4	1st		Jemmy Runtu	(Princess Gavi）	

== Pedigree ==
Pedigree of King Argentin (IDN), bay stallion, 2021
Sire Agrippa (IDN)	Almuinjjid (USA)	Blushing Groom (FR)	Red God (USA)
Sire Agrippa (IDN)	Almuinjjid (USA)	Blushing Groom (FR)	Runaway Bride (GB)
Sire Agrippa (IDN)	Almuinjjid (USA)	Herb Wine (USA)	Full Pocket (USA)
Sire Agrippa (IDN)	Almuinjjid (USA)	Herb Wine (USA)	Harbor Wine (USA)
Sire Agrippa (IDN)	Balmerini (AUS)	Balmerniro (NZ)	Balmerino (NZ)
Sire Agrippa (IDN)	Balmerini (AUS)	Balmerniro (NZ)	Coprissia (NZ)
Sire Agrippa (IDN)	Balmerini (AUS)	Donna's Beach (AUS)	Brigand (USA)
Sire Agrippa (IDN)	Balmerini (AUS)	Donna's Beach (AUS)	Donaletta (USA)
Dam Princess Missoni (IDN) KP5	Long War (USA)	Lord At War (ARG)	General (FR)
Dam Princess Missoni (IDN) KP5	Long War (USA)	Lord At War (ARG)	Luna del Miel (ARG)
Dam Princess Missoni (IDN) KP5	Long War (USA)	Lady Winborne (USA)	Secretariat (USA)
Dam Princess Missoni (IDN) KP5	Long War (USA)	Lady Winborne (USA)	Priceless Gem (USA)
Dam Princess Missoni (IDN) KP5	Mahkota Putri Aria (IDN); G4	Putra Blandford Park (IDN)	Blandford Park (USA)
Dam Princess Missoni (IDN) KP5	Mahkota Putri Aria (IDN); G4	Putra Blandford Park (IDN)	Isle of Enz (AUS)
Dam Princess Missoni (IDN) KP5	Mahkota Putri Aria (IDN); G4	Aria Missoni (IDN); G3	Juragan Tanjungsari (AUS)
Dam Princess Missoni (IDN) KP5	Mahkota Putri Aria (IDN); G4	Aria Missoni (IDN); G3	Nona Joice (IDN); G2

== In popular culture ==
During the surge of interest in Indonesian horse racing following the global release of Umamusume: Pretty Derby in mid-2025, several Indonesian illustrators created fanarts of local racehorses in the Umamusume style, including King Argentin. The organizer Sarga.co later acknowledged this trend and launched a fanart competition celebrating his victory in the 2025 Indonesia Derby.

In November 2025, during the Piala Raja Hamengkubuwono X at Sultan Agung Racecourse, an attendee appeared in a cosplay portraying an anthropomorphized version of King Argentin based on a fanart as part of a special “Umamusume”-themed exhibition race. The appearance received media coverage and became part of the event’s promotional activities.
