= Priam (horse, foaled 1970) =

Indonesian racehorse

- Breed: G1(Pordasi classification)
- Sire: Keen Court (AUS)
- Grandsire: Sostenuto (ITY)
- Dam: Bonita (LK MIN)
- Damsire: Premie (LK)
- Sex: Colt
- Foaled: 1970
- Country: Indonesia
- Colour: Bay (Jragem)
- Breeder: Albert "Abe" C.J. Mantiri
- Owner: Albert "Abe" C.J. Mantiri; Prihartono, S.H.
- Trainer: Kabori
- Jockey: Maxi Singal

Major wins
- Indonesia Derby (1974)

Priam (formerly known as Mahesa Djenar, foaled 1970) was an Indonesian racehorse. His major win at national race was in the 1974 Indonesia Derby.

== Background ==
Priam was a bay colt foaled on 1970 by A.C.J. Mantiri. His sire is Keen Court (THB AUS), a son of Sostenuto (THB ITY), and her dam is Bonita (Minahasa breed), a daughter of Premie (LK). Priam breed was classified as G1 (Generasi ke-1) based on the Pordasi classification, with a proportion of Thoroughbred genetic material of 50%.

Priam owner was Prihartono, S.H., with trainer H. Pandeirot. Priam represents the North Sulawesi contingent.

== Racing career ==
The first official Indonesia Derby took place in Ranomuut, Manado, in 1974. At that time, only six horses participated in the derby. Priam emerged victorious.

=== Racing form ===
Date	Racecourse	Race	Class	Distance	Entry	HN	Finished	Time	Jockey	Winner (Runner-up)	Ref.
1974	Ranomuut	Indonesia Derby	Derby	1400m	6	1	1st		Maxi Singal	(–)	

== Pedigree ==
Pedigree of Priam (IDN), bay colt, foaled 1970
Sire Keen Court (AUS)	Sostenuto (ITY)	Never Say Die (USA)	Nasrullah (GB)
Sire Keen Court (AUS)	Sostenuto (ITY)	Never Say Die (USA)	Singing Grass (USA)
Sire Keen Court (AUS)	Sostenuto (ITY)	Arietta (GB)	Tudor Minstrel (GB)
Sire Keen Court (AUS)	Sostenuto (ITY)	Arietta (GB)	Anne of Essex (IRE)
Sire Keen Court (AUS)	Manzana (AUS)	Newtown Wonder (GB)	Fair Trial (GB)
Sire Keen Court (AUS)	Manzana (AUS)	Newtown Wonder (GB)	Clarapple (FR)
Sire Keen Court (AUS)	Manzana (AUS)	Moni Koura (AUS)	Golden Sovereign (IRE)
Sire Keen Court (AUS)	Manzana (AUS)	Moni Koura (AUS)	Miss Cygnea (AUS)
Dam Bonita (LK MIN)	Premie (LK)	?	?
Dam Bonita (LK MIN)	Premie (LK)	?	?
Dam Bonita (LK MIN)	Premie (LK)	?	?
Dam Bonita (LK MIN)	Premie (LK)	?	?
Dam Bonita (LK MIN)	?	?	?
Dam Bonita (LK MIN)	?	?	?
Dam Bonita (LK MIN)	?	?	?
Dam Bonita (LK MIN)	?	?	?
