= Sari Pohaci =

Indonesian racehorse

Sari Pohaci II
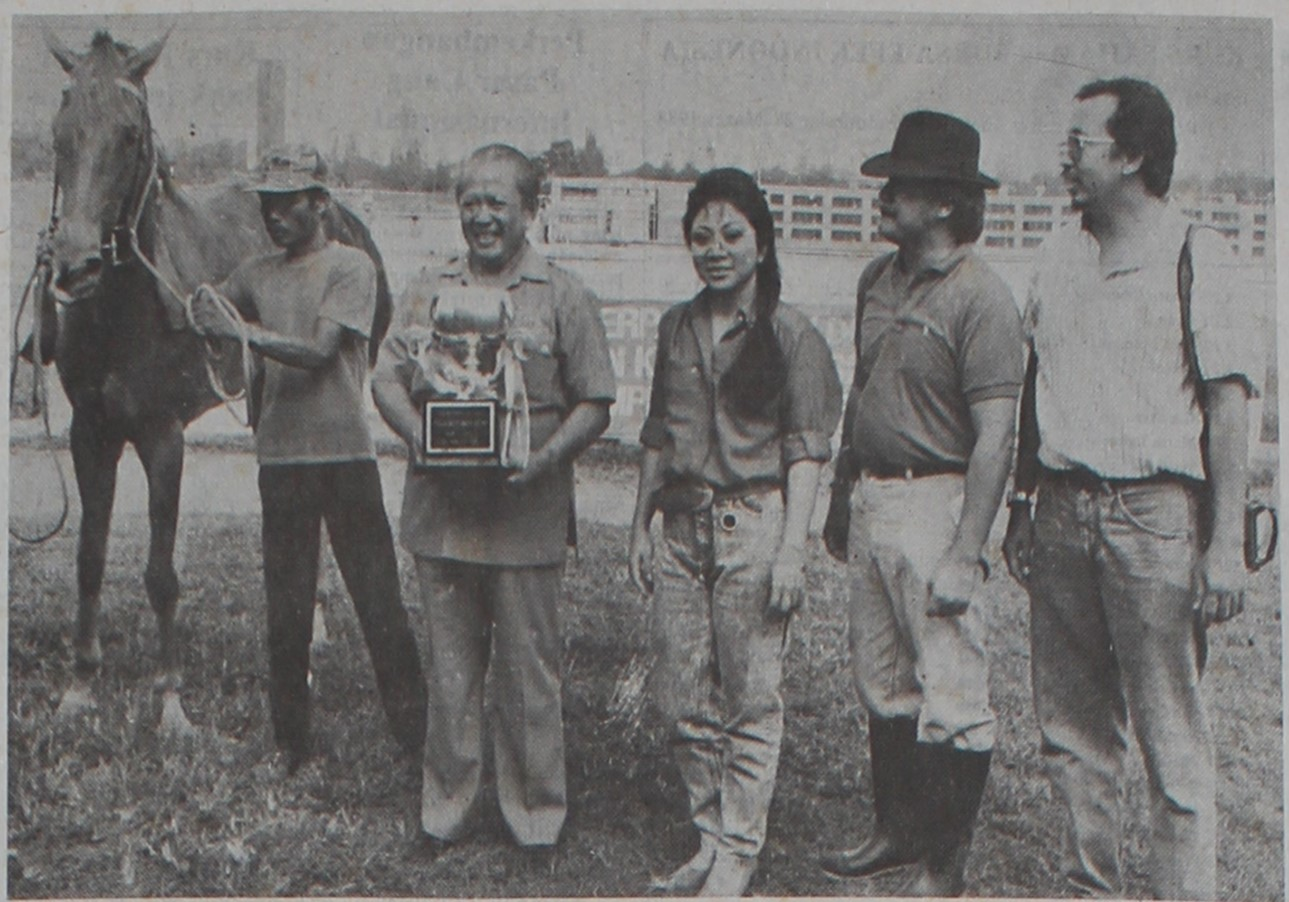
- Sari Pohaci II and her owner at 1988 Super Semar
- Breed: G2 (PORDASI classification)
- Sire: Leepar
- Grandsire: Hyperbole
- Dam: Bahtera
- Damsire: Come On Son
- Sex: Mare
- Foaled: 1983
- Country: Indonesia
- Colour: Chestnut (napas)
- Breeder: Pamulang Stable
- Owner: Pamulang Stable; Hiswara Dharma Putera
- Trainer: Mumuh
- Jockey: A. Suhara

Major wins
- Indonesia Derby (1987); Super Semar (1988)

Sari Pohaci II (Note: Officially written as Sari Pohaci II dh. Selindo.) (formerly known as Selindo, foaled 1983 in Tangerang, Banten) was an Indonesian racehorse. Her major win at national race was in the 1987 Indonesia Derby.

== Background ==
Sari Pohaci II was a chestnut mare foaled on 1983, at Pamulang Stable in Tangerang, Banten (formerly West Java). Her sire is Leepar (THB), a son of Hyperbole (THB), and her dam is Bahtera (G1), a daughter of Come On Son (THB). Sari Pohaci II breed was classified as G2 (Generasi ke-2) based on the Pordasi classification, with a proportion of Thoroughbred genetic material more than 75%.

Originally named Selindo, Sari Pohaci II was later renamed. Trained by Mumuh, Sari Pohaci II was owned by Pamulang Stable and Hiswara Dharma Putera. During her racing career, she represented the West Java contingent.

== Racing career ==
=== Racing form ===
Date	Racecourse	Name	Class	Finished	Jockey	Distance	Time	Winner (2nd place)	Ref.
July 26, 1987	Pulomas	Soeharto Cup Series 1 (Indonesia Derby)	Derby	1st	A. Suhara	1,400 M	1,13.9	(August Sunrise)	
Mar 27, 1988	Pulomas	Super Semar		1st	Gandhi Arsas	1,200 M	1,19	(Rupawan dh. Mustikaning Ratu)	
Jun 5, 1988	Pulomas	A. Bakrie Memorial	Open	3rd	Willy Wawengkang	1,200 M		Better Keen	
Sep 13, 1988	Pulomas	Piala Hari Pahlawan (Sprint)	Open	2nd	Mumuh	1,100 M		Putri	

== Pedigree ==
Pedigree of Sari Pohaci II dh. Selindo (IDN), chestnut mare, 1983
Sire Leepar (AUS)	Hyperbole	Star Kingdom (IRE)	Stardust
Sire Leepar (AUS)	Hyperbole	Star Kingdom (IRE)	Impromtu
Sire Leepar (AUS)	Hyperbole	Brianda	–
Sire Leepar (AUS)	Hyperbole	Brianda	–
Sire Leepar (AUS)	Leema	Parna	Pardal
Sire Leepar (AUS)	Leema	Parna	Marietta
Sire Leepar (AUS)	Leema	Lee Hannah	Anahuac
Sire Leepar (AUS)	Leema	Lee Hannah	Lettie Lee
Dam Bahtera (IDN)	Come On Son (AUS)	Minor Portion (IRE)	Major Portion
Dam Bahtera (IDN)	Come On Son (AUS)	Minor Portion (IRE)	Light Comment
Dam Bahtera (IDN)	Come On Son (AUS)	Hello Love	–
Dam Bahtera (IDN)	Come On Son (AUS)	Hello Love	–
Dam Bahtera (IDN)	Angin Puyuh (IDN)	–	–
Dam Bahtera (IDN)	Angin Puyuh (IDN)	–	–
Dam Bahtera (IDN)	Angin Puyuh (IDN)	–	–
Dam Bahtera (IDN)	Angin Puyuh (IDN)	–	–
