= Indonesian Racing Horse =

Indonesian breed of horse

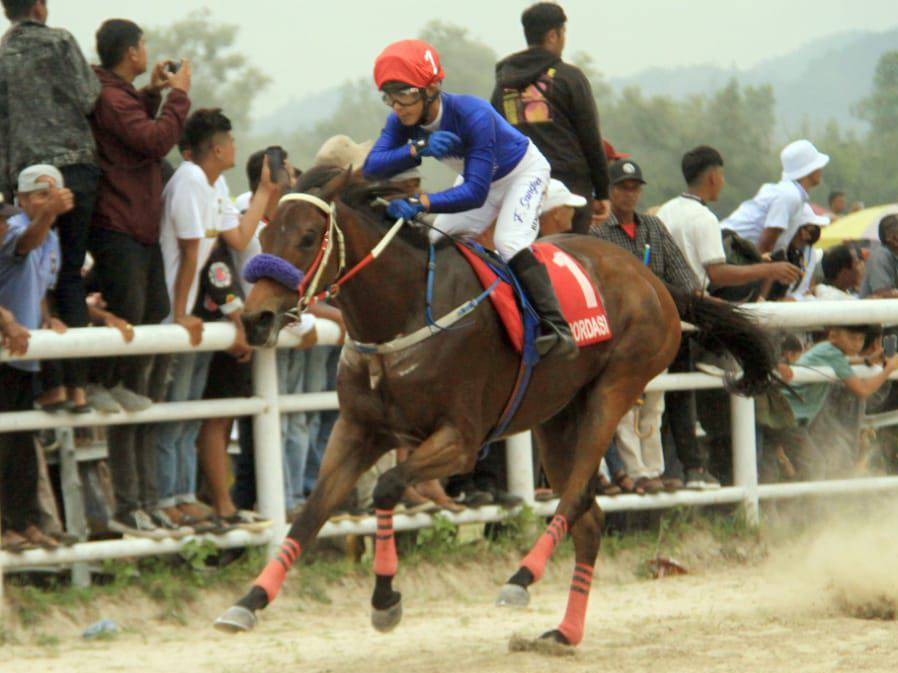
- Falentino Sangian on Atardecer Nagari at Sawahlunto Racecourse in 2023
- Conservation status: FAO (2007): not at risk; DAD-IS (2025): unknown
- Other names: Kuda Pacu Indonesia; Kuda-Pacu Indonesia; KPI
- Country of origin: Indonesia
- Distribution: Jakarta; Central Java; East Java; West Java; Yogyakarta; East Nusa Tenggara; West Nusa Tenggara; Central Sulawesi; North Sulawesi; South Sulawesi; West Sumatra
- Use: horse racing

Traits
- Weight: Male: 450 kg; Female: 400 kg
- Height: Male: 165 cm; Female: 155 cm

The Indonesian Racing Horse or Kuda Pacu Indonesia is an Indonesian breed of racehorse. It derives from cross-breeding of imported Thoroughbred stallions with mares of local breeds. A stud-book was established in 1995.

== History ==
From about 1971 racehorses of the English Thoroughbred breed were imported to Indonesia from European countries, from Australia – which supplied at least 200 horses – and from the USA. Stallions of this breed were cross-bred with mares of local Indonesian stock to produce faster and more powerful racing animals. A stud-book for the cross-breeds was established in 1995 with the breed name Kuda Pacu Indonesia. The breed was defined to be the fourth-generation (F4) cross, and thus to derive nominally in the ratio 15:1 from the two constituent types of parent stock, Thoroughbred and local. It was recognised by decree of the Indonesian minister of agriculture in 2013.

It is distributed in the Jakarta, Central Java, East Java, West Java and Yogyakarta provinces of Java; in East and West Nusa Tenggara; in Central, North and South Sulawesi; and in West Sumatra.

== Characteristics ==
The Kuda Pacu Indonesia is a composite of Thoroughbred and local horses, bred from third- and fourth-generation (F3/F4) crosses.

The average height at the withers is about 155 cm for mares and 165 cm for stallions and geldings; average body weights are approximately 400 kg and 450 kg respectively.

== Use ==
The horses are bred specifically for horse racing. A horse of this breed, Cahaya Nagari, took first place in the Indonesia Derby in 2010, the first of the breed to do so.
