= Kejurnas Pacuan Kuda PORDASI =

Kejuaraan Nasional Pacuan Kuda PORDASI
- Class: Championship Event Series
- Location: Changes yearly
- Inaugurated: 1966; 60 years ago
- Race type: G/Kuda Pacu Indonesia/KP/Thoroughbred; Flat racing
- Website: sarga.co

Race information
- Distance: See individual races
- Surface: Dirt
- Track: Right-handed
- Qualification: Based on height and age
- Purse: Varies by race; between Rp 20,000,000–Rp 300,000,000

Kejuaraan Nasional Pacuan Kuda PORDASI (lit. 'PORDASI National Horse Racing Championship'), usually just called Kejurnas series, is an annual series of national-level horse racing championship held annually in Indonesia. The championship began in 1966 and has run for 60 seasons. The championship is divided into two main series. The first series is held in late July or early August, focusing on age-group races, and the second series is held in late September or early October, focusing on height groups. Each participant represents a provincial contingent. The contingent with the most points in both series wins the "Piala Presiden."

The entire Kejurnas series is under the auspices of the PORDASI (Indonesian Equestrian Sports Association) Racing Commission, in conjunction with Sarga.co, and is part of the Indonesia's Horse Racing series.

== History ==
=== Early history (1996–1974) ===
On November 12–13, 1966, the first Kejurnas was held in Bogor. On this occasion, it was also announced that the government officially recognized PORDASI as the sole governing body for equestrian sports in Indonesia through a decree dated October 28, 1966 by Director General of Sports. Suharto, who would later become President of the Republic of Indonesia, agreed to become the Patron of PORDASI and have his name immortalized on the rotating trophy for the Kejurnas. Diana, owned by Suharto, became the first winner, receiving the "Piala Suharto." The championship also featured a demonstration of steeplechase, a discipline never before seen in Indonesia. In 1971, the government, with Australian assistance, established a racing facility called the Pulomas Racecourse, which would later become the regular venue for the Kejurnas until 2015.

After the fall of the New Order, the name of the trophy for the Kejurnas was changed to the "Piala Bhayangkara," and then again to the "Piala Presiden."

== Format ==
The PORDASI Racing Commission holds two Kejurnas series annually, consisting of various races. The first series is usually held in late July or early August (except for the 1998 season, which was postponed to December because riots), focusing on age-group competitions. In the first series, the main race is the Indonesia Derby (2000 m), a classic race for three-year-old horses. In addition, two races specifically for Thoroughbred horses were also held. The second series, usually held in late September or early October, focuses on height-group competitions (classes A–F). In the second series, the main races are the Star of Stars (2200 m, long distance) and the Super Sprint (1300 m, sprint). A week before the Kejurnas, qualifying races will be held. Horses that qualify will advance to the finals. Those that don't will compete in the non-finalist class, with smaller prizes.

The Kejurnas uses a handicap system assigned to each horse based on its age, sex, and height their height class. As a general rule, for every centimeter above the minimum height for a class or age over 2 years, the horse is given an additional 0.5 kg in its weight, up to 2 kg for the horse's age. Fillies and mares are given a 1 kg allowance.

The Kejurnas uses a points system to determine the overall champion. Points are accumulated from the first and second series. The contingent with the most points is declared the overall champion. Each contingent represents its province and its respective Provincial Executive Board (Pengprov) of PORDASI. According to regulations, horse owners and their horses are eligible to represent a contingent at the Kejurnas if they have been with the contingent for at least one year.

== Races ==
According to the Indonesian horse racing system, horses crossbred with Thoroughbreds (called G or KP) are classified based on height. This classification is indicated by the letters F (shortest in Kejurnas) to A (tallest).

The number of racing classes generally varies each year, depending on the number of participants. The committee may combine some classes if they don't meet the minimum number of participants (for example, classes C and D become class C/D).

=== First series ===
Breed	Class	Distance	Points			Total Points
Breed	Class	Distance	1st	2nd	3rd	Total Points
G/KP/KPI	3y Derby (Indonesia Derby)	2000m	16.5	11	5.5	33
G/KP/KPI	3y Juvenile	1600m	12	8	4	24
G/KP/KPI	2y Beginner Class A/B	1400m	10.5	7	3.5	21
G/KP/KPI	2y Beginner Class C/D	1200m	9	6	3	18
G/KP/KPI	4y Class A/B	2000m	12	8	4	24
G/KP/KPI	4y Class C/D	1600m	9	6	3	18
THB	2y	1400m	9	6	3	18
THB	3y+	1600m	12	8	4	24
Total Points			90	60	30	180

=== Second series ===
Breed	Class	Distance	Points			Total Points
Breed	Class	Distance	1st	2nd	3rd	Total Points
G/KP/KPI	Class A Open (Star of Stars)	2200m	12	8	4	24
G/KP/KPI	Class A Sprint (Super Sprint)	1300m	10.5	7	3.5	21
G/KP/KPI	Class B Open	1850m	10.5	7	3.5	21
G/KP/KPI	Class B Sprint	1200m	9	6	3	18
G/KP/KPI	Class C Open	1600m	9	6	3	18
G/KP/KPI	Class C Sprint	1100m	7.5	5	2,5	15
G/KP/KPI	Class D Open	1400m	7.5	5	2,5	15
G/KP/KPI	Class D Sprint	1000m	6	4	2	12
G/KP/KPI	Class E	1200m	6	4	2	12
G/KP/KPI	Class F	1000m	6	4	2	12
Total Points			90	60	30	180

Note: G/KP: mixed breed horse with Thoroughbred; KPI: Kuda Pacu Indonesia; THB: Thoroughbred

== Main race winner ==
=== Early winners ===
Piala Suharto (1966–74)

- 1966 - Diana
- 1967 - Little King
- 1968 - Bintang Kakanda
- 1969 - Kawanua
- 1970 - Prima Donna
- 1971 - Prima Donna
- 1972 - Damayanti
- 1973 - Damayanti
- 1974 - Damayanti

=== Kejurnas Series I ===
Indonesia Derby (1974–present, 2000 m)

=== Kejurnas Series II ===
Star of Stars (1996–present, 2200 m)

Super Sprint (2009–present, 1300 m)

== See also ==
- Horse racing in Indonesia
- Indonesia Derby
