= Equestrian Association of Indonesia =

Government body of equestrianism in Indonesia

- Sport: Equestrian
- Jurisdiction: Indonesia
- Abbreviation: PORDASI
- Founded: June 6, 1966; 60 years ago
- Affiliation: Federation Equestre Internationale (FEI)
- Headquarters: Jakarta
- President: Aryo Djojohadikusumo
- Secretary: Adinda Yuanita

Official website
- www.pordasi.id
- (Indonesia)

The Equestrian Association of Indonesia (Indonesian: Persatuan Olahraga Berkuda Seluruh Indonesia, abbreviated as PORDASI) is the governing body of equestrianism in Indonesia. It was founded on 6 June 1966.

PORDASI has four separate national commissions for each equestrian discipline: Komisi Pacu (horse racing), Komisi Equestrian (dressage, jumping, eventing, etc.), Komisi Polo, and Komisi Berkuda Memanah (horse riding archery). PORDASI is a member of the Federation Equestre Internationale.

== History ==
After World War II in around 1950, horse racing enthusiasts in Indonesia took the initiative to revive the sport. Organizations such as the Jakarta-Bogor Horse Racing Association (Perkumpulan Pacuan Kuda Jakarta Bogor, PPKDB) and the Priangan Horse Racing Association (Perkumpulan Pacuan Kuda Priangan, PPKP) emerged. Efforts to unite these associations resulted in the formation of the Indonesian Horse Racing Association (Pusat Organisasi Poni seluruh Indonesia, POPSI) around 1953, led by Lieutenant Colonel Singgih. Unfortunately, POPSI failed to develop into a strong federation.

Equestrian enthusiasts and clubs in West Java, Central Java, East Java, and North Sulawesi agreed to form a new organization. Beginning with an exhibition championship in Bandung on 9 June 1966, a meeting on 11–12 June 1966, in Bandung officially gave birth to the Equestrian Association of the Indonesia (PORDASI), with Achmad Sham as its general chairman.

On 12–13 November 1966, the first National Horse Racing Championship (Kejurnas) was held in Bogor. On this occasion, it was announced that the government officially recognized PORDASI as the national organization of equestrian sports in Indonesia through the Surat Keputusan Direktur Jenderal Olahraga No. 016/tahun 1966 dated 28 October 1966.
