= List of Indonesian horse breeds =

This is a list of the horse breeds usually considered to be native to Indonesia. Some may have complex or obscure histories, so inclusion here does not necessarily imply that a breed is predominantly or exclusively Indonesian.

| Local names | English name if used | Numbers | Region | Notes |
|---|---|---|---|---|
| Agam | | 1500 | West Sumatra | |
| Bali | | 1250; 3500 | Bali | |
| Batak | | 12000; 7500 | North Sumatra, Aceh, Sumatra | also known as Deli Pony |
| Bima | | 50000; 140000 | Sumbawa, Nusa Tenggara Barat | variety of Sumbawa |
| Flores | | 20000; 25000 | Nusa Tenggara Timur | |
| Gayo | | 2500; 7500 | West Sumatra, Aceh | |
| Gorontalo | | 2000 | North Sulawesi | |
| Java | | 30000; 50000 | Java | |
| Kaili | | 10000 | North Sulawesi | |
| Kalimantan | | 3500 | Kalimantan | |
| Kuda-Pacu Indonesia | Indonesian Racing Horse | 4500 | | F4 cross of Sandel and Thoroughbred |
| Kuningan | | 7500; 15000 | West Java | |
| Lombok | | 5000 | Lombok, Nusa Tenggara Barat | |
| Makasar | Macassar | 190000; 215000 | Sulawesi | |
| Minahasa | | 5000; 1000 | North Sulawesi | cross-bred from Sandel and Thoroughbred, for racing |
| Padang Mangatas | | 1000 | West Sumatra | |
| Priangan | | 7000 | West Java | |
| Rote (Kori) | | 1250 | | |
| Sandelwood, Sandel | Sandalwood | 45000; 55000 | Sumba, Nusa Tenggara Timur | |
| West Sumatra-Sandel-Arab | | 5000; 6000 | West Sumatra | cross-bred since 1918 from Sandel and Thoroughbred |
| Sumbar-Sandel-Arab | | | | |
| Sumbawa | | 77837 | Sumbawa | |
| Timor | | 20000 | West Timor, Flores-Nusa Tenggara Timur | |
