= Gayoe =

Breed of horse

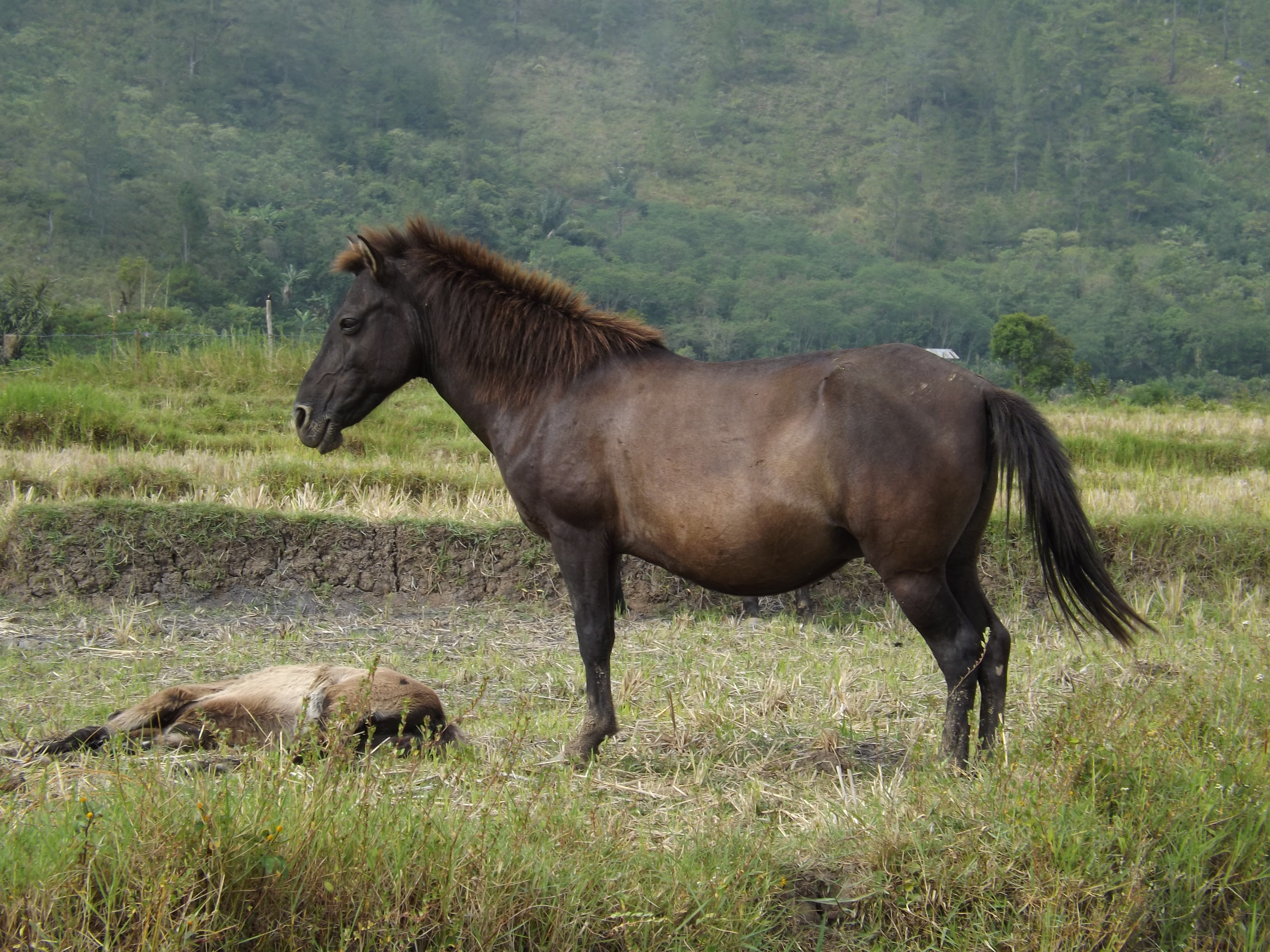
- Country of origin: Sumatra, Indonesia

The Gayoe (Indonesian: kuda Gayo) is a pony from the island of Sumatra, found near Aceh. The name is derived from the Gayoe hills in the north of the island.

The Gayoe is one of the pony breeds native to Indonesia; the others are the Batak Pony, Deli pony, Bali Pony, Java Pony, Sumba and Sumbawa Pony (and closely related Sandalwood Pony) and Timor Pony.

== Characteristics ==
The Gayo belongs to the group of Southeast Asian ponies, and within it, to the subgroup of Indonesian ponies. According to reference measurements by the FAO, the average height of females is 1.14 m (3 ft 9 in), and of males 1.18 m (3 ft 10 in). The CAB International book (2016 edition) reports an average height of 1.27 m (4 ft 2 in).

This pony is not as lively as the Batak and has a heavier build, with small size caused by the lack of nutritional quality in local vegetation.

The head is short and sturdy, with long ears. The body is narrow, compact, and short, with a short neck, a half-circle-shaped belly, and a long, full tail.

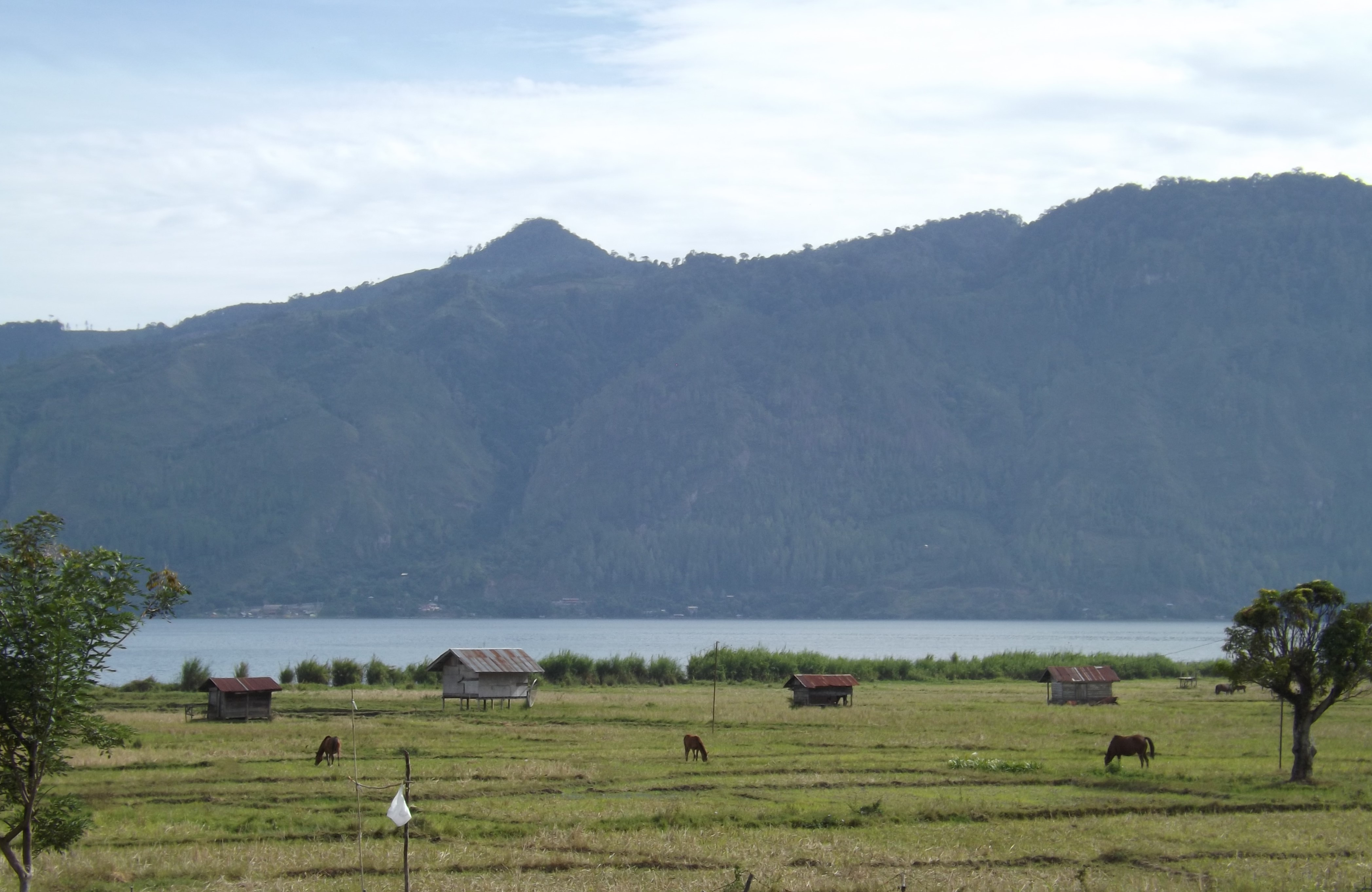
Gayo ponies in pastures on the southern shore of Lake Laut Tawar

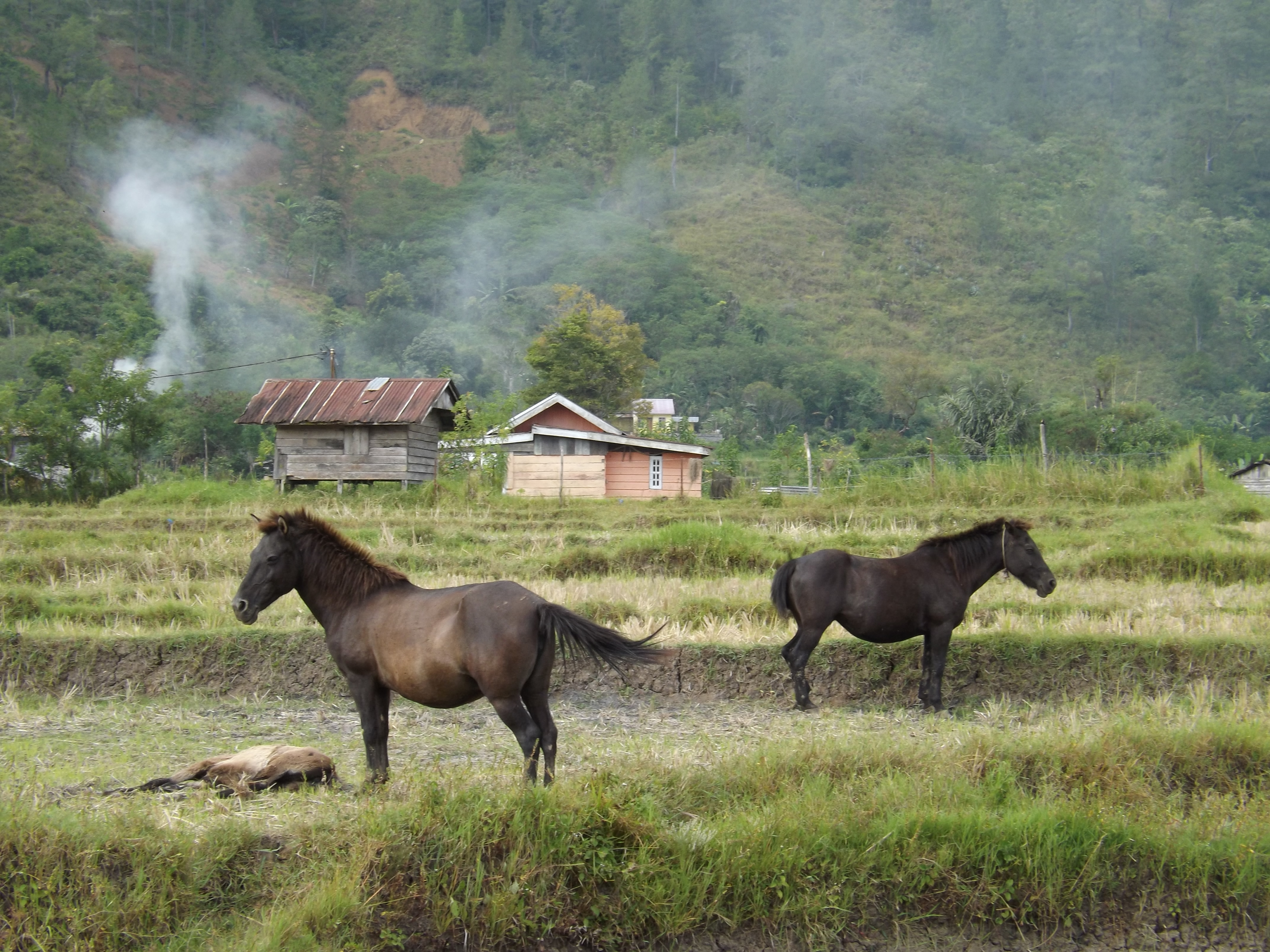
Gayo breed horses in a meadow at Takengon

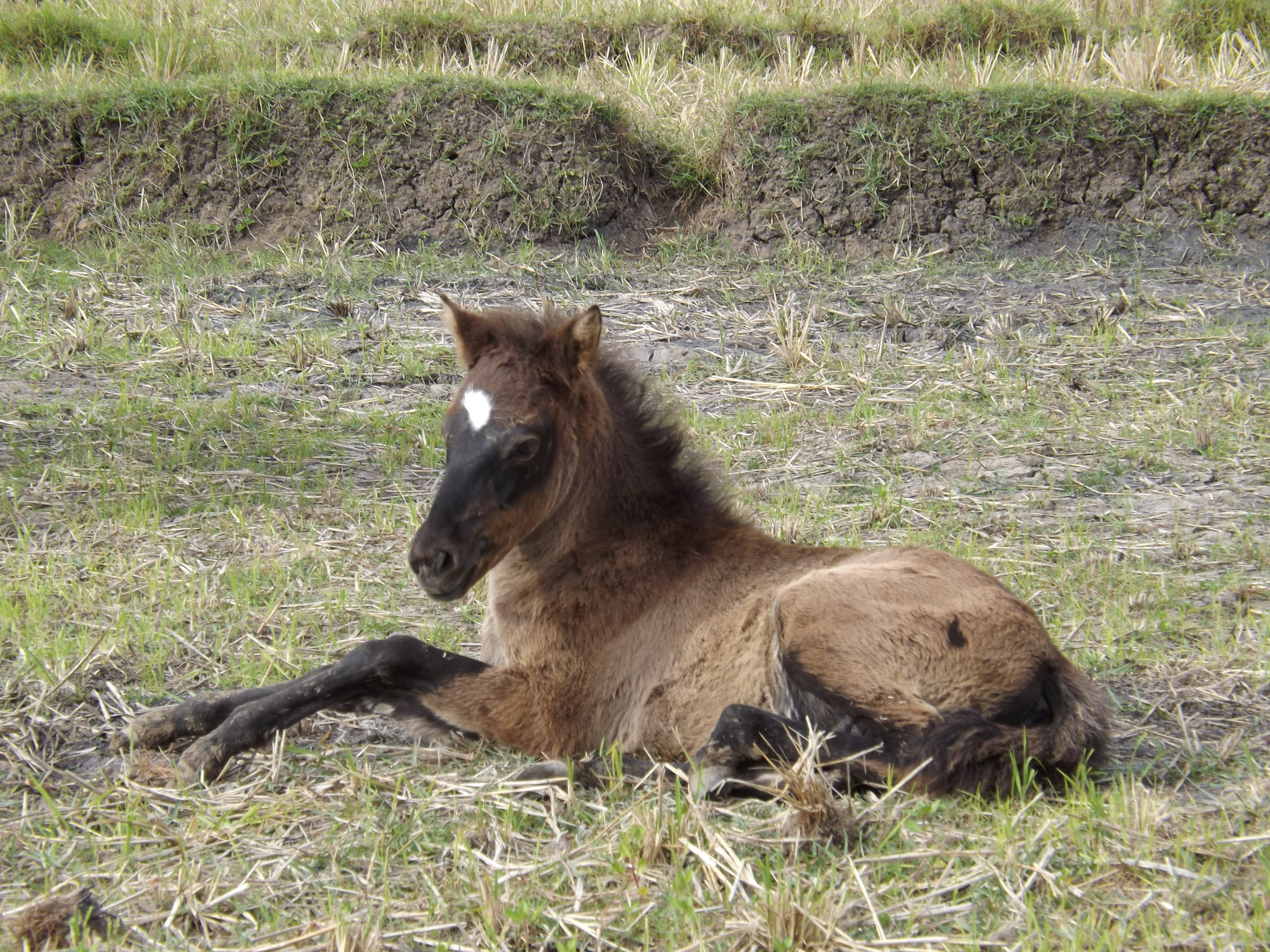
Gayo breed foal

The coat is solid and variable in color, but usually dark bay or bay-brown. According to CAB International, piebald is possible, either black or bay piebald. Gray also exists. The Gayo has good reproductive characteristics. Its temperament is calm and stable.

=== Similarities to Batak pony ===
The Gayo is not always distinguished from the Batak pony as a separate breed. Some authors consider it a variety of the Batak, notably in the Delachaux guide. W. Groeneveld (1916) considers the Batak and Gayo as two distinct varieties among the four he records on Sumatra. John Crawfurd (1956) distinguishes two breeds on Sumatra, that of Aceh (the Gayo) and that of Batu Bara Regency. The encyclopedia by Charles Evelyn Graham Hope and Noel Jackson treats the Gayo and Batak in a single article without distinction. Other popular works cite it as a separate breed. The FAO, CAB International, and the University of Oklahoma study treat it as a separate breed, the latter noting that very little information is available on the Gayo. The official position of the Indonesian government (2014) is to consider the Gayo a separate breed due to the uniformity of its physical form.

== Breed history ==
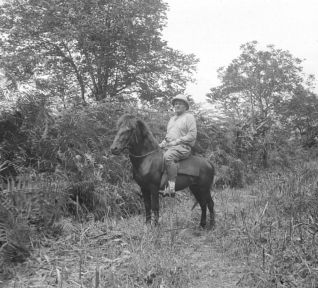
Gayo pony ridden in Aceh, 1927

According to the DAD-IS database managed by the Food and Agriculture Organization (FAO), "Gayo" (in Indonesian) is the most common international name, specified as kuda Gayo, meaning "Gayo horse". "Gayoe" is the English name, and "Gaju" (or Kaju) the Flemish name. The breed takes its name from the Gayo population living in northern Sumatra, in the interior highlands of Aceh province.

The Gayo has no studbook. Its origin dates back to the 18th century. It is primarily influenced by Mongolian horses, and to a lesser extent, Persian and Arabian horses.

This pony was long confused with the Batak and Minang breeds, erroneously under the name "Deli". This confusion arises from the pony importation system via Dutch-flagged ships: animals from the East were unloaded at the port of the Deli Sultanate. John Anderson visited several northern Sumatra ports between 1823 and 1825. He reported the presence of horses in the Aceh region. The ports served as export points, with animals reaching other Indonesian regions in considerable numbers, according to him. The breeding center on Sumatra seems to have shifted over time, with the Aceh region giving way to the Batak settlement area as the main export zone.

In the early 20th century, Gayo pack ponies were reputed to be "small but very strong". In 1997, a fairly accurate count reported to the FAO recorded 7,500 ponies, with a stable trend. A decree from the Indonesian Minister of Agriculture (number 1054 / Kpts / SR.120) dated October 2014 created a Gayo horse breeding nucleus to prevent the breed's extinction.

=== Current status ===
The Gayo is classified as a local Indonesian horse breed, adapted to its biotope. It originates from Aceh in northern Sumatra, as well as the west of the island. The "Gayo" is listed in the Uppsala University study (2010) for the FAO as a local Asian breed not at risk of extinction. According to the FAO assessment in 2007, the breed "kuda-Gayo" was then "not at risk". An official 2014 count recorded only 1,656 ponies, placing the Gayo among endangered breeds.

There is no specific conservation program. Gayo racehorses were celebrated on a stamp issued by the Indonesian government for the Chinese Year of the Horse in 2014. The breed is nationally recognized for its economic and cultural value.

== Uses ==
The Gayo is mainly used for transport, whether ridden, as a pack horse, or in harness. It can be used in working equitation or as a racehorse. More recently, it has become a tourist attraction. Finally, this pony is now popular as a mount for children.

Horse races are regularly organized in the region since about 1930. Their popularity increased after Indonesia's independence. The most famous races are held in August to commemorate independence. The mounts are not purebred Gayo but crossbred horses from matings with Australian animals. These races mainly take place from late August to mid-September and involve betting, despite being prohibited in the country.

Its horse meat has long been consumed, northern Sumatra being a horse-eating region. Gayo pony meat is reputed to be particularly tender and juicy.

== See also ==
- List of Indonesian horse breeds
