= Batic (surname) =

Batić (Serbian: Батић) is a South Slavic surname. Notable people with the surname include:

- Olgica Batić (born 1981), Serbian lawyer and politician
- Vladan Batić (1949–2010), Serbian lawyer and politician

== See also ==
- Polly Batic (1906–1992), Austrian operatic mezzo-soprano
- Batič, Slovene surname
- Batik (disambiguation)
