= Batak (disambiguation) =

Batak may refer to:

== Ethnic groups ==
It is a collective term used to identify a number of ethnic groups predominantly found in North Sumatra, Indonesia.

- Associated with the Indonesian Batak people:
  - Batak languages
  - Batak script
  - Batak (Unicode block)
  - Marga (Batak), Batak's family name
- Batak (Philippines), indigenous group of the Philippines
- Batek people, indigenous group of peninsular Malaysia

== Locations ==
- Batak, Bulgaria, a city in Pazardzhik Province, Bulgaria
  - Batak massacre (1876) in the city
  - Batak Reservoir, near the city, in the Rhodope Mountains
- Batak, a village in Pavlikeni Municipality, Veliko Tarnovo Province, Bulgaria
- Batak Rabit, a small town in Hilir Perak district, Perak, Malaysia

== Other ==
- Batak Pony
- Huria Kristen Batak Protestant
- Radoslav Batak (born 1977), Montenegrin football defender
- Batik (disambiguation), a technique of dyeing cloth, or cloth made using this technique, originating from Indonesia
- Batak, Philippine tattoos of the Igorot people
