= Lombok horse =

Indonesian horse breed

Lombok pony
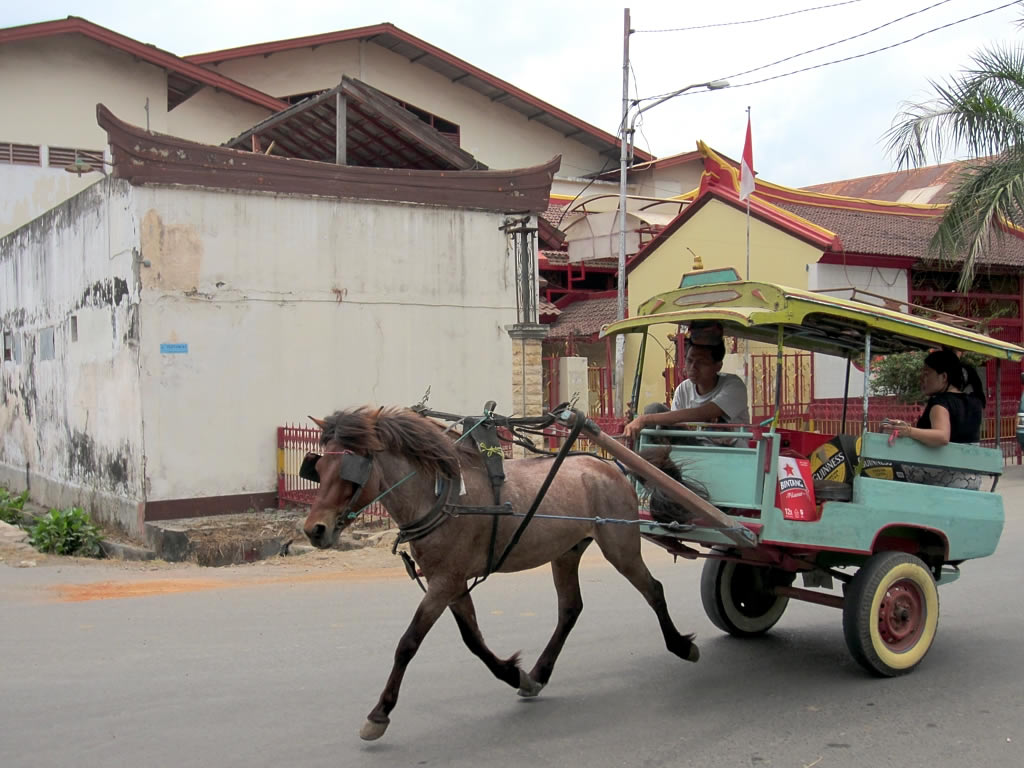
- Lombok bay pony, hitched to a "cidomo".
- Use: Packhorse, saddle horse and horse-drawn vehicle

Traits
- Height: About 1.22 m
- Color: Bay, seal brown or chestnut

The Lombok horse (Indonesian: Kuda lombok) is a small horse breed native to the island of Lombok, Indonesia. Likely descended from Mongolian horses, the breed has been influenced by equine populations from neighboring islands, particularly Java. The Lombok horse is also frequently exported to other parts of Indonesia. Standing approximately 1.22 meters (12 hands) tall, the Lombok horse is a lightly built, high-legged pony. It is closely related to the Macassar pony of southern Sulawesi and is sometimes regarded as a subtype of that breed. Lombok horses are traditionally used to pull cidomo, small two-wheeled horse-drawn carts commonly seen on the Gili Islands. Despite their modest size, they are capable of hauling heavy loads, including building materials and beverages. As of 2003, the population of Lombok horses in Indonesia was estimated at approximately 5,000 individuals.

== Description ==
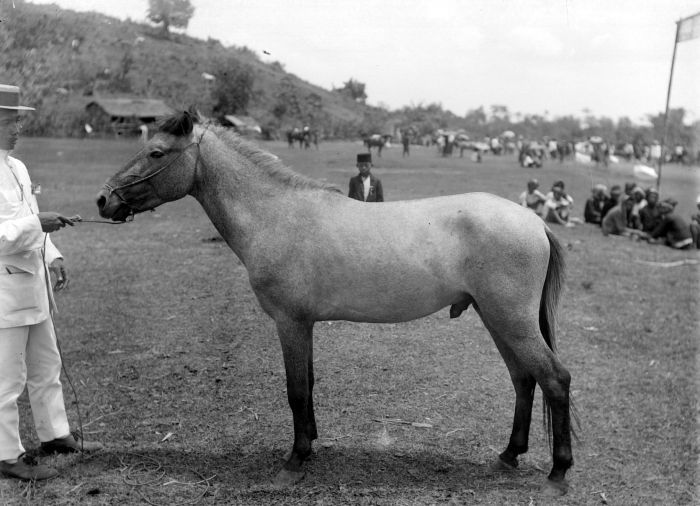
Lombok pony, model, from the archives of the Collectie Stichting Nationaal Museum van Wereldculturen (1900-1940)

According to CAB International (2016) and the second edition of the University of Oklahoma Encyclopedia of the Horse (2007), the Lombok horse typically stands approximately 1.22 meters at the withers. However, smaller average heights have also been reported—1.14 meters for males and 1.11 meters for females—as noted by the DAD-IS database and the Delachaux Guide (2014).

The breed conforms to the general profile of native Indonesian ponies, which are typically small and lightly built. Lombok ponies are relatively high-legged, with a broader chest than the closely related Bali pony, and feature a short, smooth mane.

Coat colors are most commonly bay or chestnut, with bay and seal brown being the most frequently observed. The Delachaux guide lists only the dark bay as typical. The breed is considered hardy, low-maintenance, and well-adapted to local conditions. Unlike on many other Indonesian islands, where horses are commonly left to graze freely, Lombok ponies are generally fed on cut hay and are often well cared for by their owners, particularly those used to pull cidomo—traditional two-wheeled carts common on the Gili Islands.

== History ==
The breed is locally known as Kuda lombok, with kuda meaning "horse" in Indonesian. It is closely related to the Macassar or Sulawesi pony, native to southern Sulawesi, and is sometimes considered a local variant or subtype of that breed. These two breeds are frequently described together in the literature.

As with other native Indonesian pony breeds, the Lombok horse is believed to descend from Mongolian horses, which were likely introduced through centuries of maritime trade and migration. An 1851 edition of the Journal of the Indian Archipelago and Eastern Asia describes the Lombok pony as a cross between Bali and Sumbawa breeds. Historical accounts also suggest that horses from Dutch breeding stock may have influenced the local population during the colonial period.

While Lombok has occasionally been noted as a horse-exporting island, especially during the 19th century, the scale and economic significance of this trade appear to have been limited. By 1515, East Java was reportedly receiving regular supplies of ponies from Lombok. According to Tomé Pires, a Portuguese writer in the early 16th century, horses were also exported from Java to Lombok, indicating a bidirectional trade.

During the Dutch colonial era, Lombok ponies were exported to other islands, particularly in the 1850s, although reliable sources on this trade are scarce. Contemporary records mention that livestock boats, equipped with kulis (laborers), were used for inter-island pony transport. Imports of horses into Lombok also occurred, albeit in smaller numbers. Notably, in the 1850s, local rajahs are reported to have purchased English mares from Sydney, which they bred with Lombok and Macassar stallions.

Between 1890 and 1910, exports of Lombok ponies declined significantly. By 1922, the breed was considered a small, relatively unimportant horse, though limited exports to Java continued. In the following decades, trade in Lombok horses further declined, as horses from other Indonesian islands became more prominent in regional transport and agriculture.

== Use ==
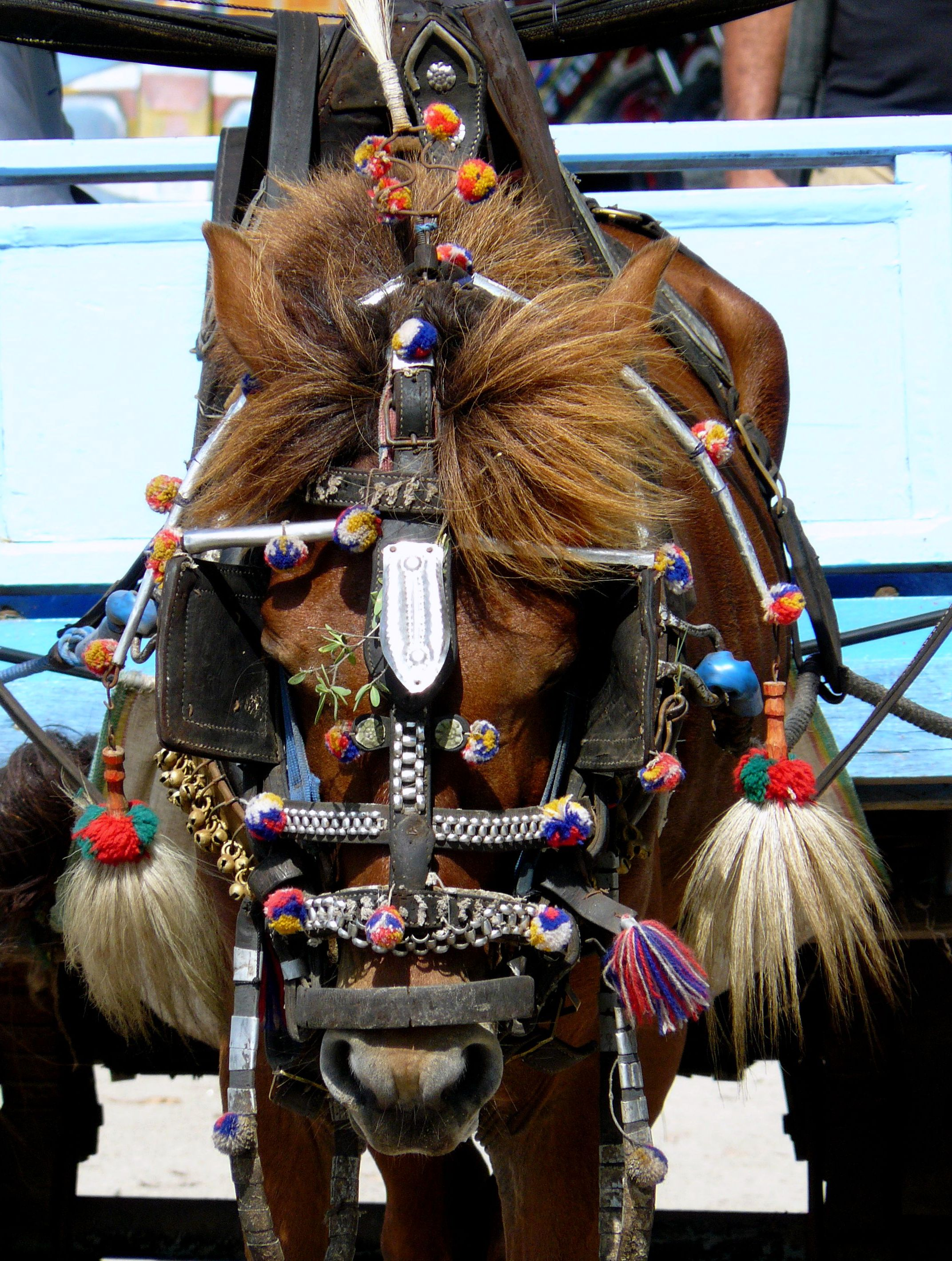
Lombok pony with harness bridle decorated with tassels and bells

The Lombok horse is used as a packhorse, a riding horse, and for pulling horse-drawn vehicles. It is also commonly ridden for working equitation. It remains widely employed for road transport and is best known for pulling cidomo—small, brightly colored, partially covered two-wheeled carts with pneumatic tires—particularly common on the Gili Islands. On these islands, cidomo are the primary means of transportation. This practice has become valued as a tourist attraction, contributing to the rural charm of the islands in the eyes of visitors. On the Gili Islands, these horses often pull heavy loads, such as building materials or crates of Bintang, an Indonesian beer. The horse-drawn vehicles are generally unregistered; however, each island has its own cidomo registration and licensing system, and there is a limit on the number of carts per island. As of 2023, all cidomo are required to be licensed and to pay operating taxes.

Lombok horses also have cultural importance as a source of meat. The consumption of horse products by locals is believed to have resulted from colonial influence and adaptation to the local slaughter tax system. Records indicate that hippophagy has been practiced since at least 1924.

Reports of horse abuse have been documented on the Gili Islands. The nonprofit organization Yayasan Horses of Gili collaborates with other groups to promote equine welfare, including establishing veterinary clinics and providing training for horse handlers.

== Spreading breeding ==
The Lombok horse is a breed adapted to the local environment of Lombok and the western Lesser Sunda Islands (West Nusa Tenggara). The DAD-IS database does not provide an assessment of its conservation status or current population figures. The Delachaux Guide estimated the population at around 5,000 animals in 2003, indicating that it is a breed of limited distribution within Indonesia.

== See also ==
- List of Indonesian horse breeds

== Bibliography ==
- Bankoff, Greg; Swart, Sandra (2007). Breed of empire : The "Invention" of the Horse in Southeast Asia and Southern Africa 1500-1950 (PDF). Copenhague: National Institute of Agrobiological Sciences. ISBN 978-87-7694-014-0.
- Hendricks, Bonnie Lou (2007). International Encyclopedia of Horse Breeds (2nd ed.). Norman: University of Oklahoma Press. ISBN 978-0-8061-3884-8.
- Porter, Valerie (2002). Mason's World Dictionary of Livestock Breeds, Types and Varieties (5th ed.). CAB International. ISBN 0-85199-430-X.
- Porter, Valerie; Alderson, Lawrence; Hall, Stephen J. G.; Sponenberg, Dan Phillip (2016). Mason's World Encyclopedia of Livestock Breeds and Breeding (6th ed.). CAB International. ISBN 978-1-84593-466-8.
- Rousseau, Élise (2014). Tous les chevaux du monde (in French). Delachaux et Niestlé. ISBN 978-2-603-01865-1.
