= Cidomo =

Small horse-drawn carriage

Horse-drawn carts in Indonesia have various regional names such as Dokar, Cidomo, Delman and Andong. Dokar is mostly used on Bali and cidomo on Lombok. The carriages are pulled by a single horse and are brightly colored with tassels and bells on the harness. Cidomos have pneumatic tyres and most of the others have wooden wheels. Most of the carriages seat up to four people, with two longitudinal bench seats in the rear, passengers facing each other, and entry from the rear.

Horse-drawn transport in Indonesia is very slow and contributes to traffic congestion in the towns. Horse dung poses a problem in towns, and horse drivers have been urged by the Indonesian government to clean up after themselves or face suspension. Some people are concerned about the horses' welfare as many horses are undernourished, work long hours, show signs of dehydration, and sometimes suffer beatings from their drivers. Population growth in Denpasar has caused motorcycles to make dokars effectively obsolete.

Indonesian horse-drawn carts

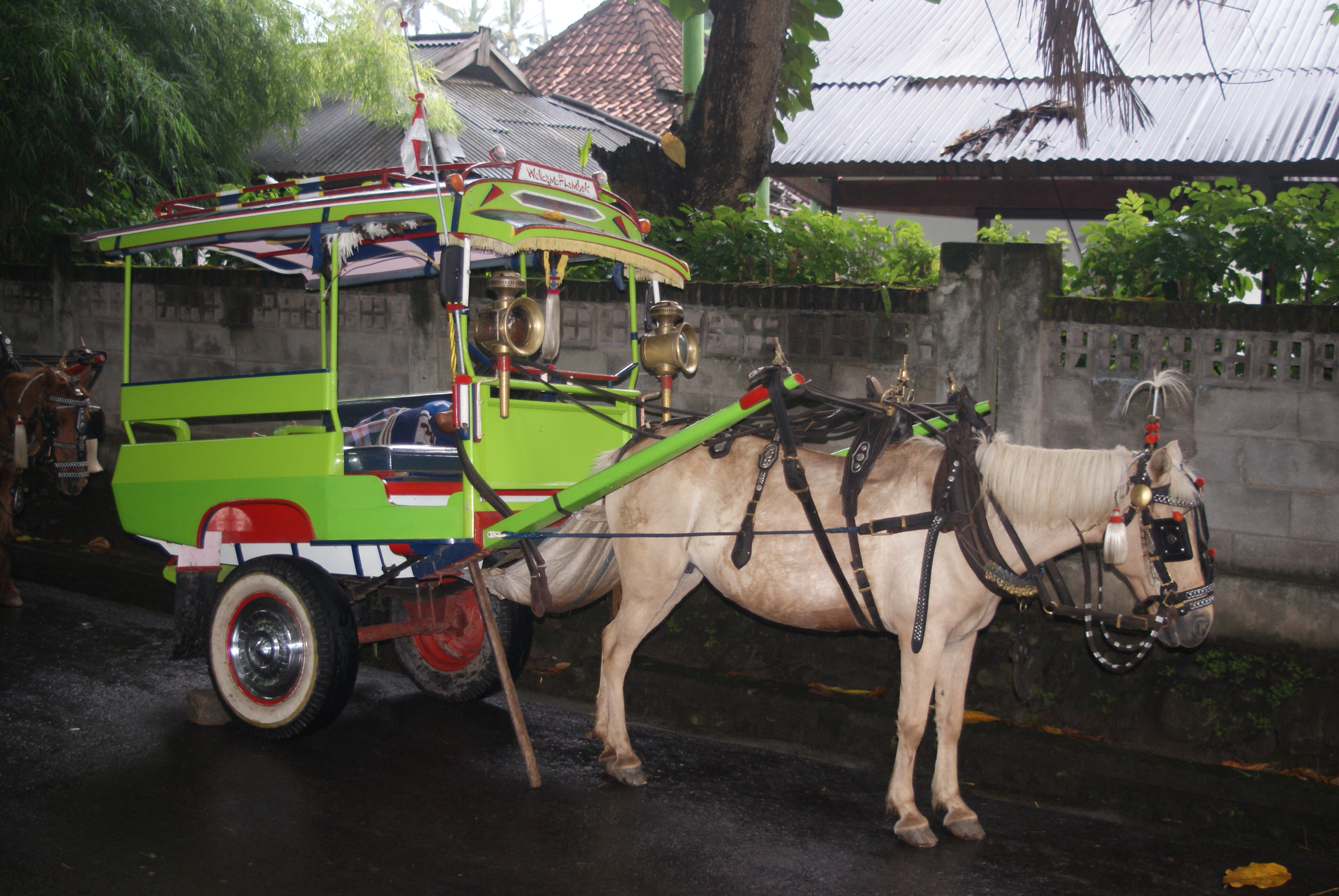
Cidomo in Senggigi Beach, Lombok

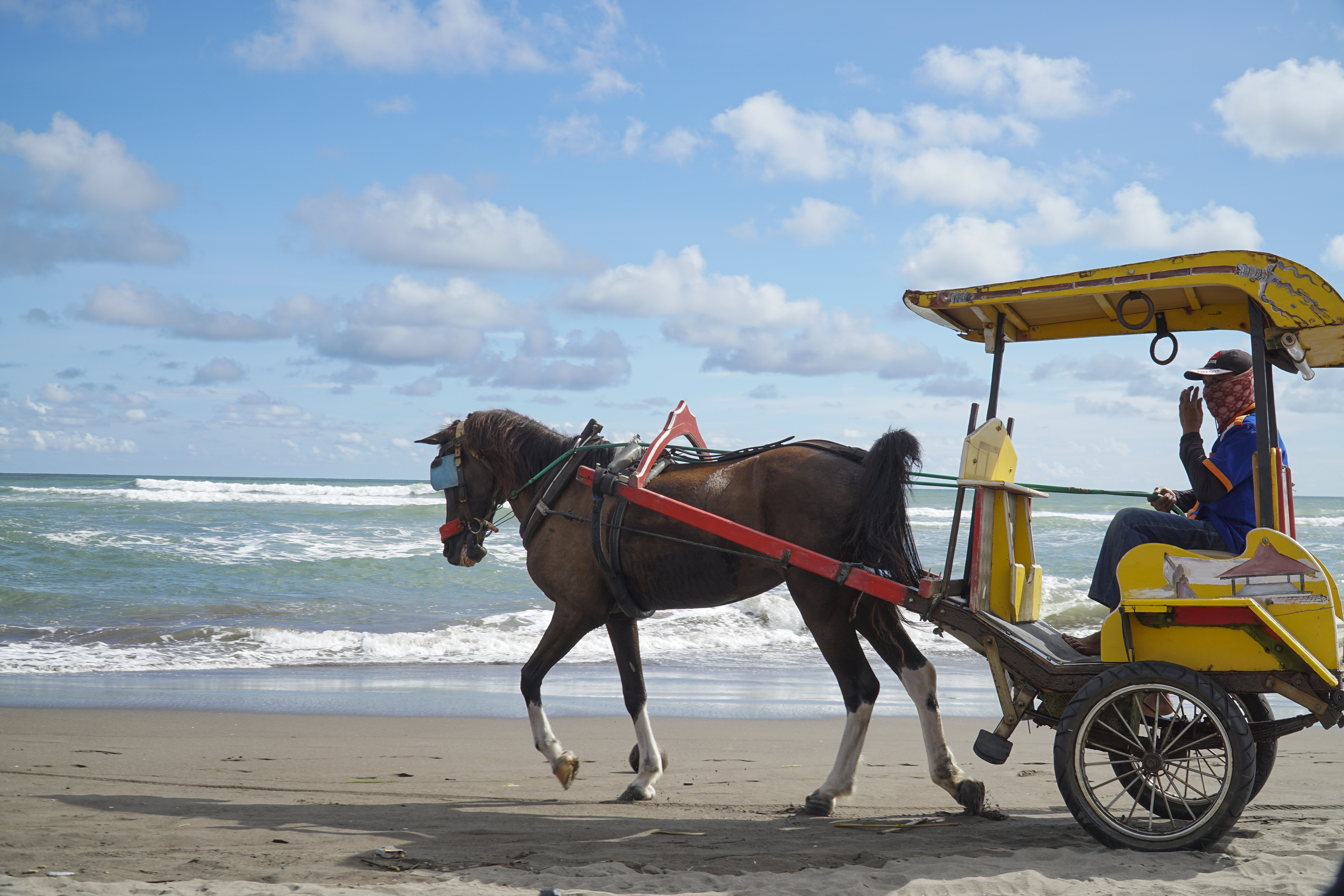
Dokar in Yogyakarta

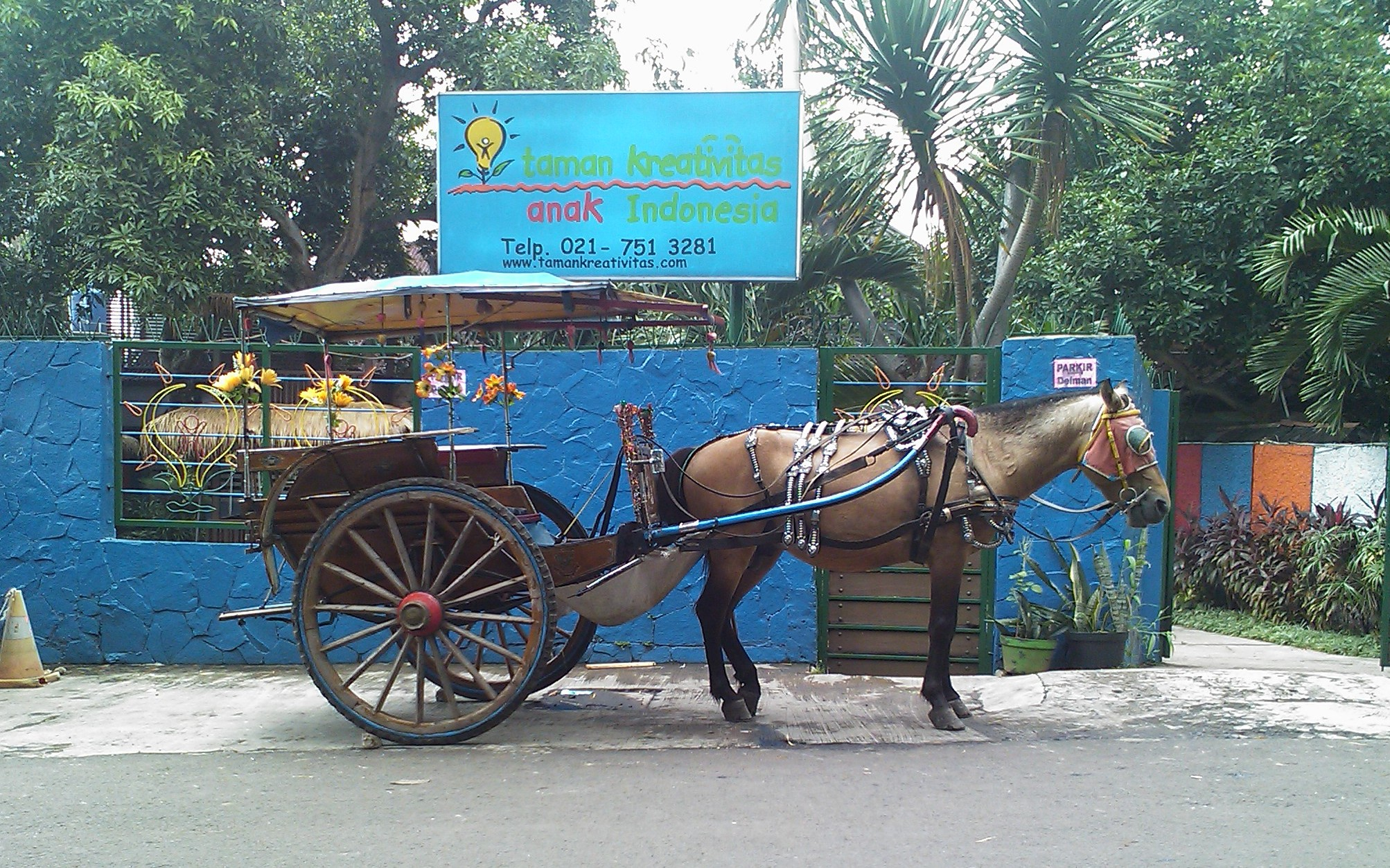
Delman in Jakarta

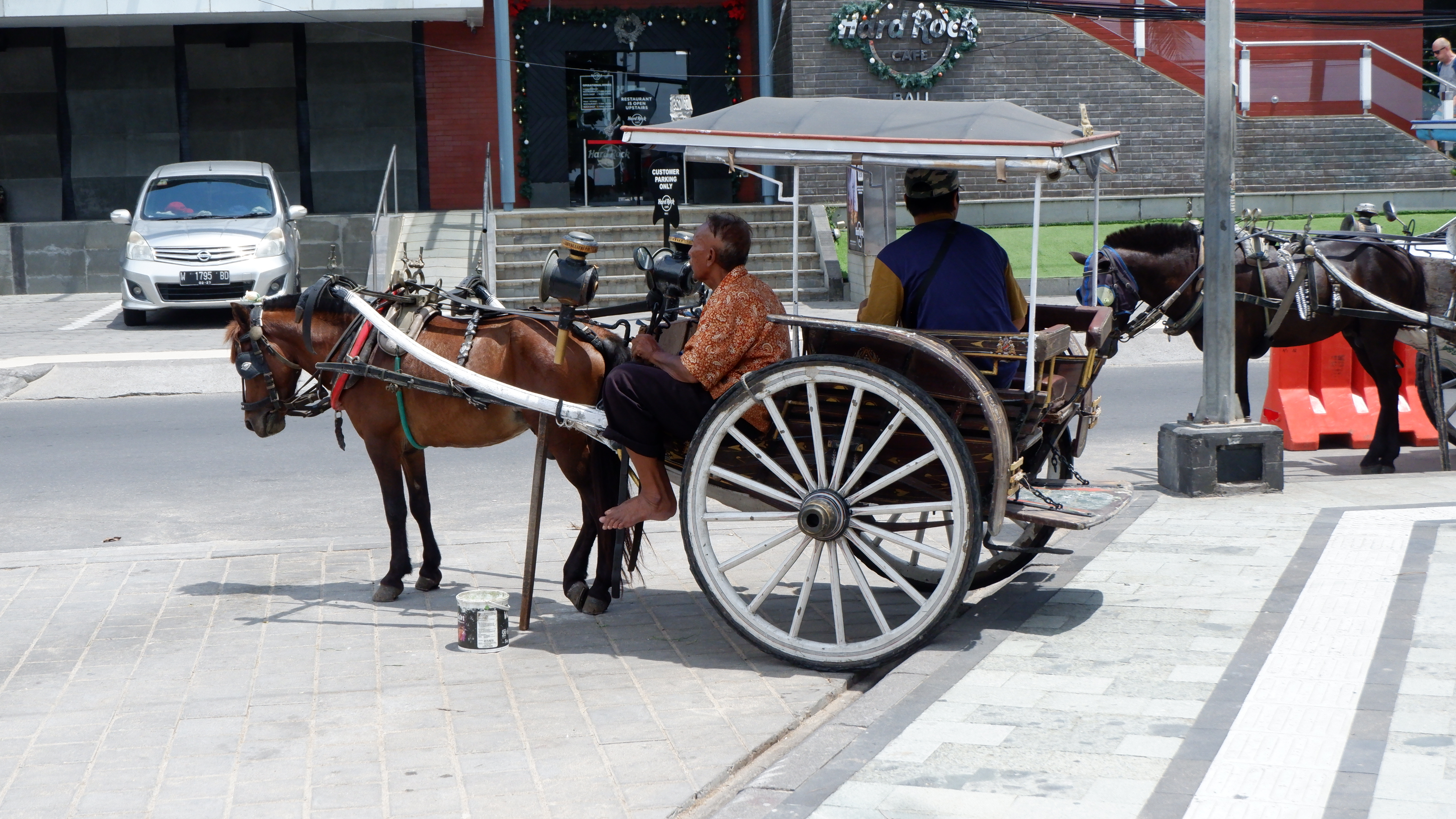
Andong in Kuta Beach, Bali

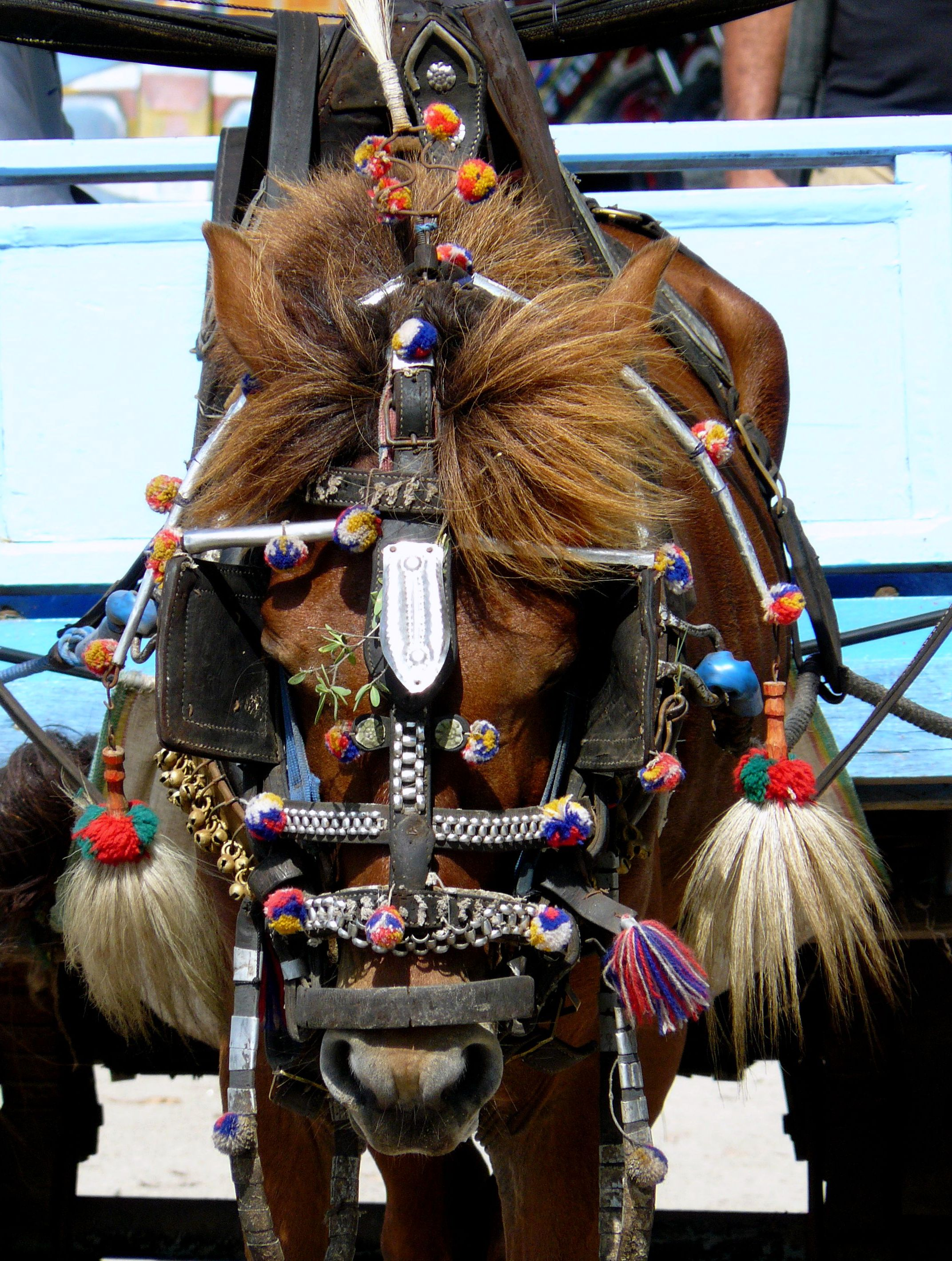
Harness bridle decorated with tassels and bells

== See also ==
- Lombok horse
