= Batic =

Batic may refer to:

- Batîc, a commune in Geamăna, Moldova
- Batić Mirković, 15th century Bosnian nobleman and magnate
- Batič (surname), a name found in Slovenia
- Batić (surname), a name found in Serbia
- Polly Batic (1906–1992), Austrian operatic mezzo-soprano

== See also ==
- Batik (disambiguation)
