= Horses in East Asian warfare =

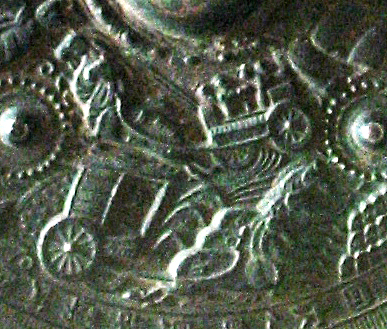
Horse chariot – Detail of a bronze mirror c. 5th–6th century excavated Eta-Funayama Tumulus in Japan.

Horses in East Asian warfare are inextricably linked with the strategic and tactical evolution of armed conflict throughout the course of East Asian military history. A warrior on horseback or horse-drawn chariot changed the balance of power between the warring civilizations throughout the arc of East Asian military history.

When warring East Asian civilizations were at odds, as the civilization with horses clashed with those without, horses provided a huge advantage to overcome, prevail, and subdue their adversaries. When both contending sides had horses, the decisive outcomes from battles hinged on the strength and strategy of their mounted horsemen. Throughout the arc of East Asian military history, strategies, and tactics were refined in terms of the use of horses.

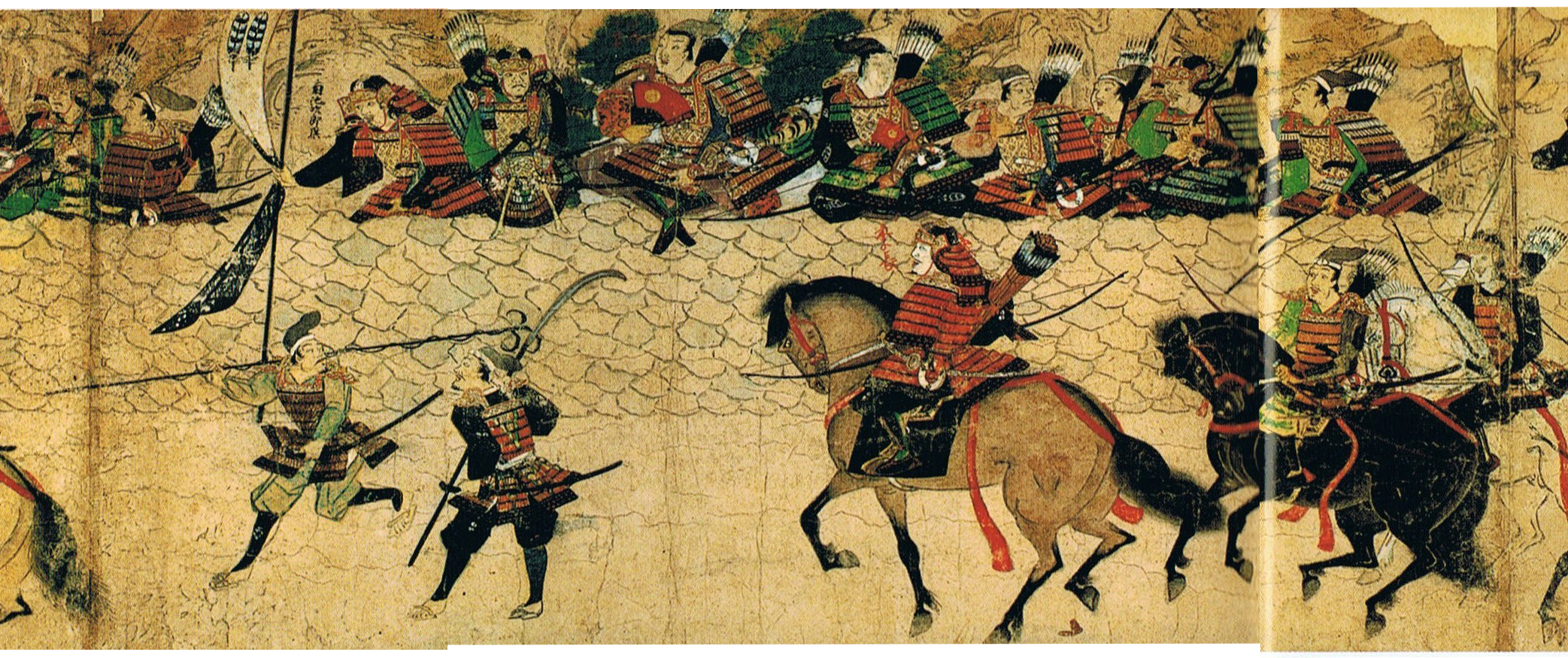
Arriving Japanese samurai prepares to man the fortification against invaders of the Mongol invasions of Japan, painted c. 1293

As in most cultures around the globe, a war horse in East Asia was trained to be controlled with limited use of reins, responding primarily to the rider's legs and weight. Horses were significant factors in the Han-Xiongnu Wars and Wuhu incursions against past kingdoms of China, and the Mongol conquest of much of Eurasia and into Europe. They played a part in military conflicts on a smaller, more localized scale.

== History ==
=== Horse warfare in national contexts ===
==== China ====
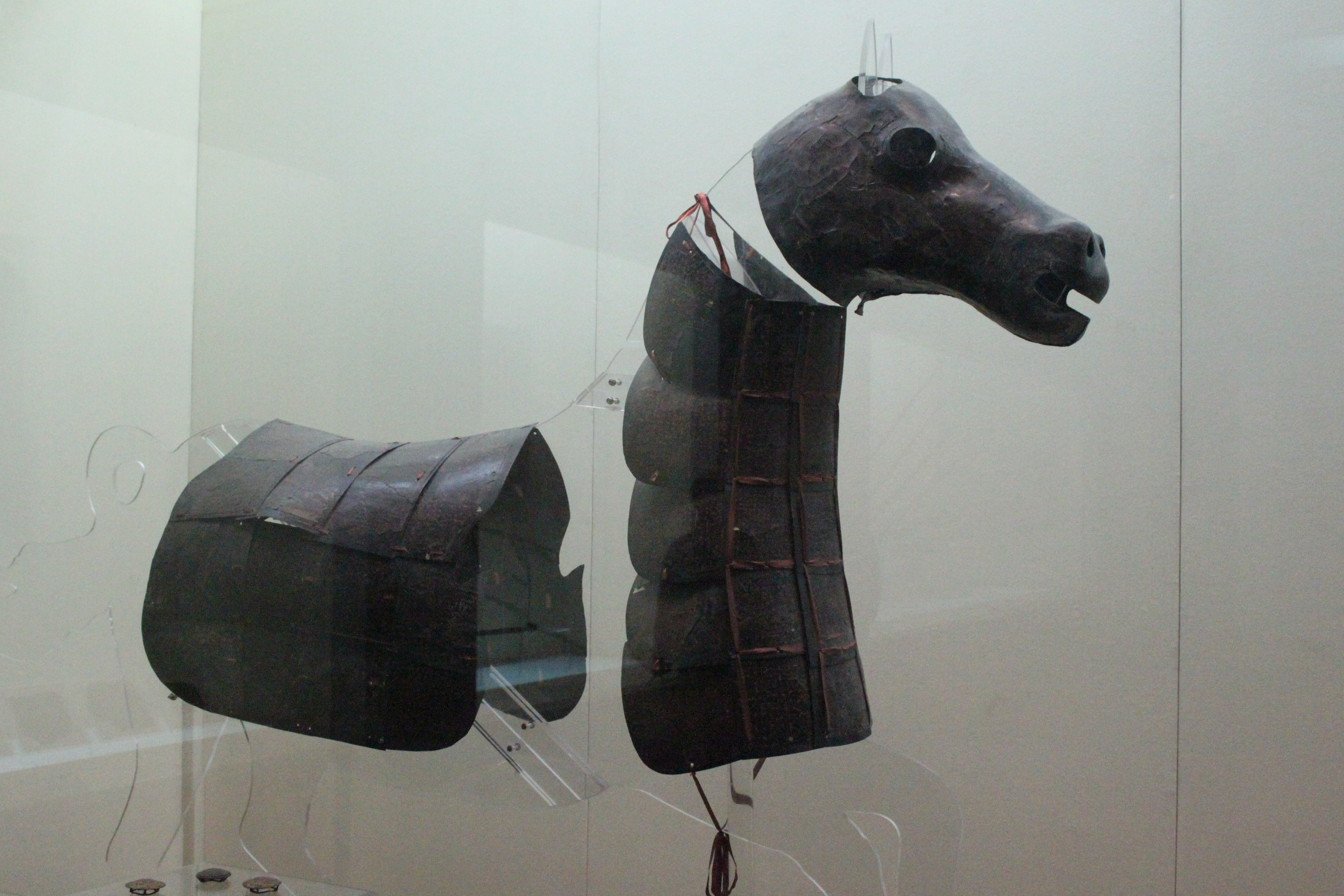
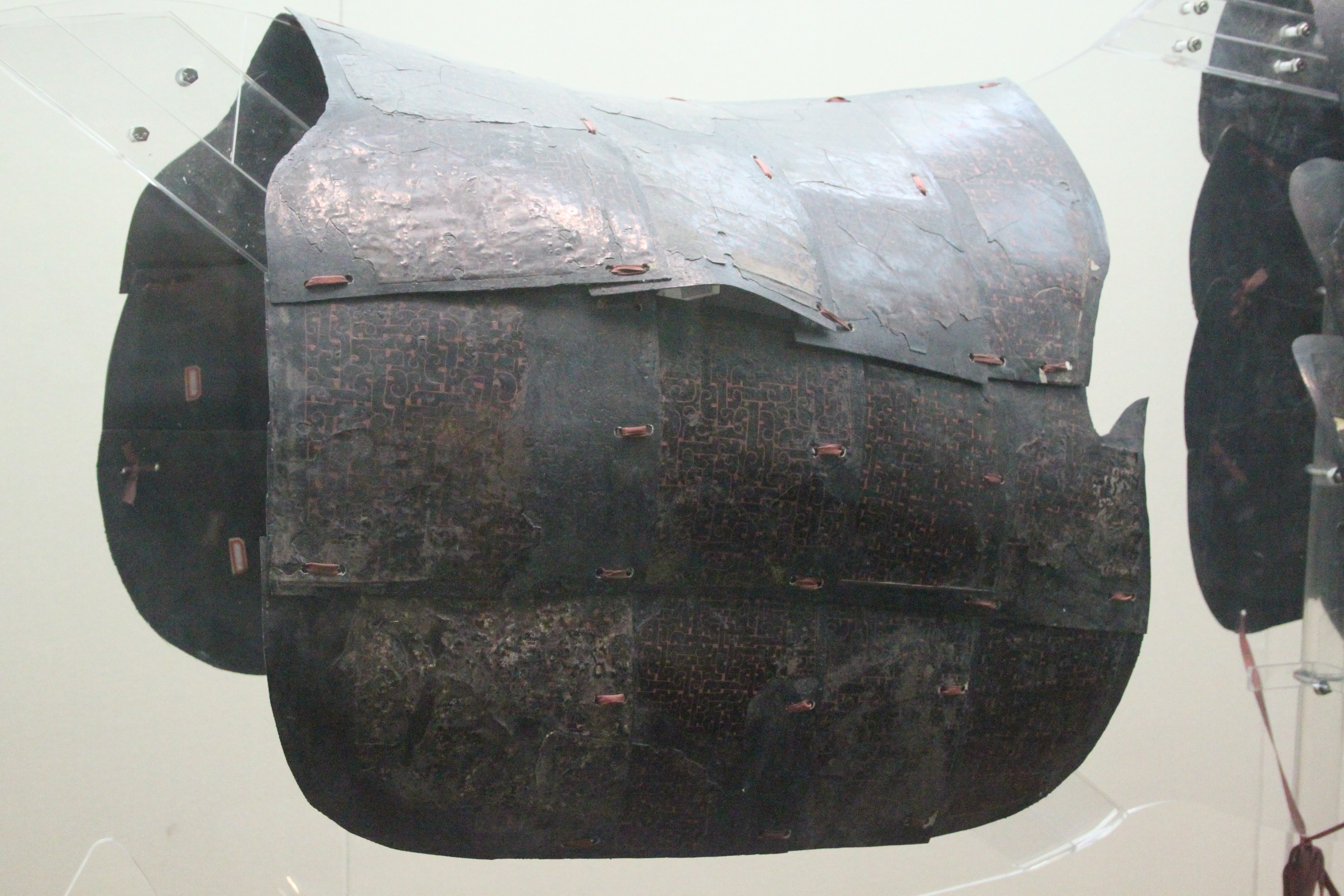
Lacquered horse armor excavated from the Tomb of Marquis Yi of Zeng, Eastern Zhou dynasty, China

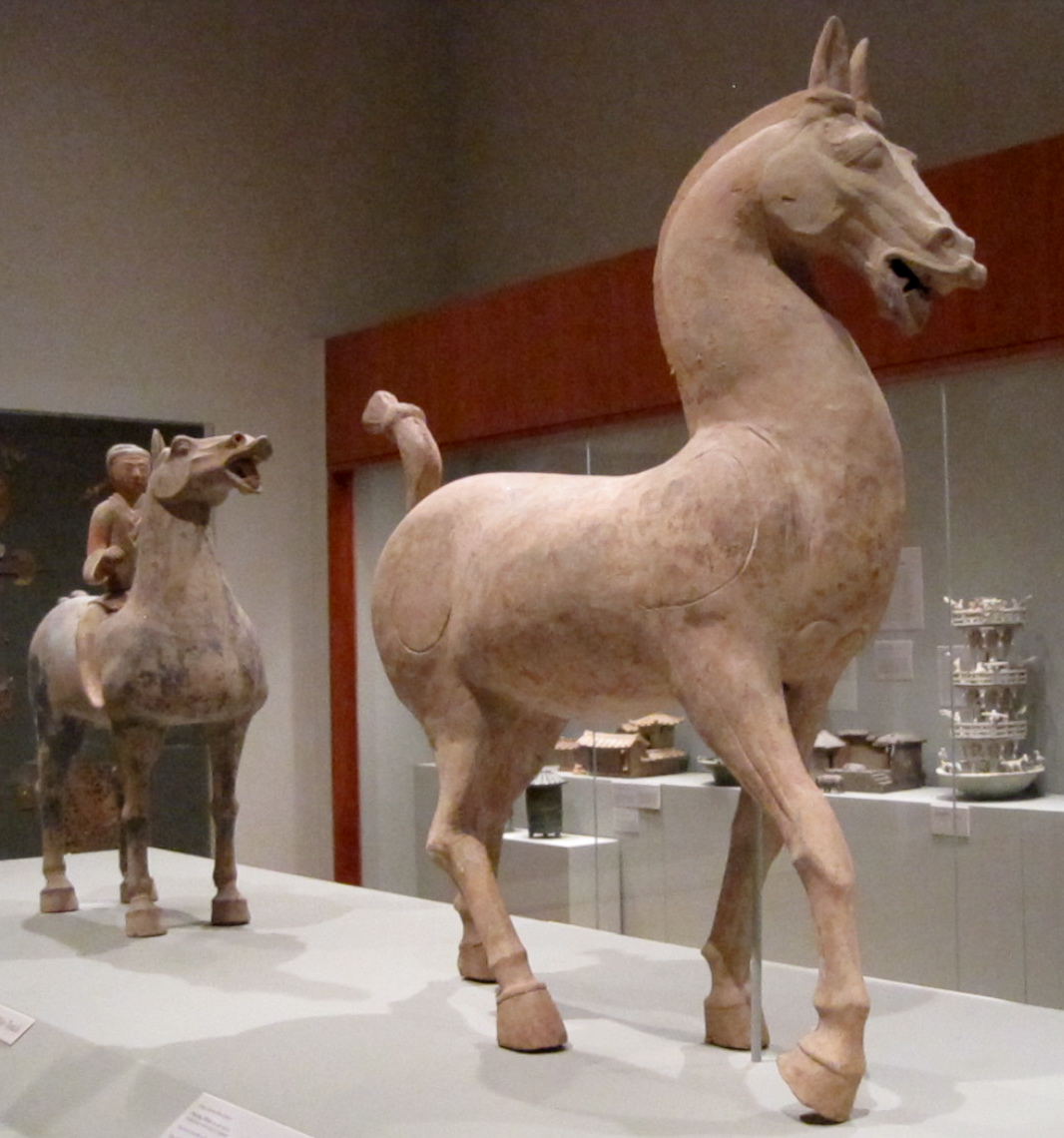
Ceramic statues of a prancing horse (foreground) and a cavalryman on horseback (background), Eastern Han dynasty (25–220 CE)

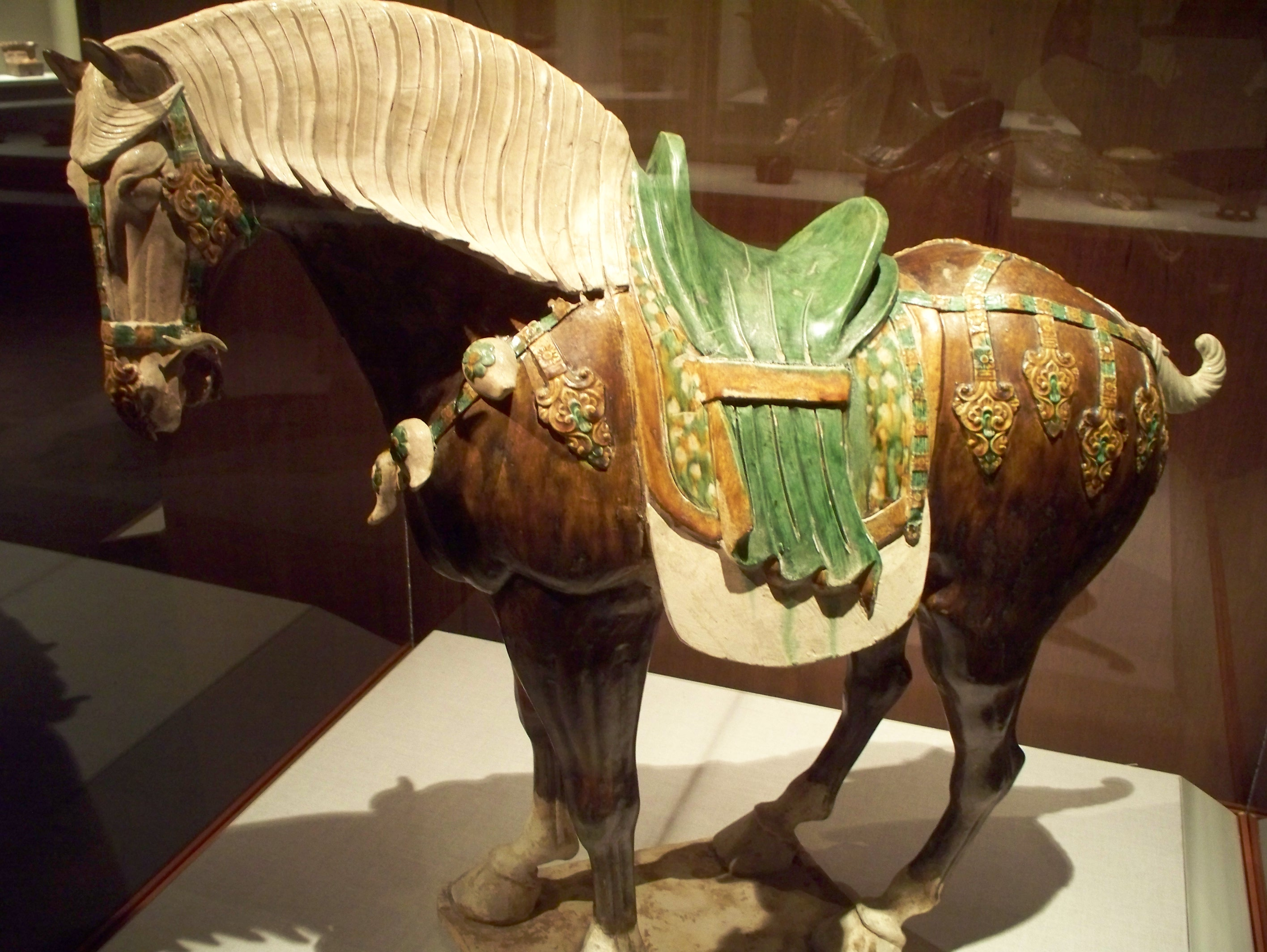
A sancai lead-glazed earthenware horse statue with a saddle, Tang dynasty (618–907 CE)

There were horse-driven chariots of the Shang (c. 1600 – c. 1050 BCE) and Zhou (c. 1050 – 256 BCE) periods, but horseback riding in China, according to David Andrew Graff, was not seen in warfare prior to the 4th century BC.

King Wuling of Zhao (340 BCE-295 BCE), after realizing the advantages of light cavalry warfare over that of the heavy and cumbersome chariots, instituted reforms generally known as "胡服骑射" (wearing of the Hu-nomadic people's attire, and shooting arrows from horseback), which greatly increased the combat-effectiveness of the army of Zhao.

Although mounted archers represented an initial tactical advantage over Chinese armies, the Chinese learned to adapt. Conservative forces opposed change, which affected the proportional balance amongst cavalrymen, horse-drawn chariots and infantrymen in Chinese armies.

The benefits of using horses as light cavalry against chariots in warfare was understood when the Chinese confronted incursions from nomadic tribes of the steppes.

Feeding horses was a significant problem; and many people were driven from their land so that the Imperial horses would have adequate pastures. Climate and fodder south of the Yangtze River were unfit for horses raised on the grasslands of the western steppes.

The Chinese army lacked a sufficient number of good quality horses. Importation was the only remedy but the only potential suppliers were the steppe-nomads. The strategic factor considered most essential in warfare was controlled exclusively by the merchant-traders of the most likely enemies.

The Chinese used chariots for horse-based warfare until light cavalry forces became common during the Warring States era (402–221 BCE); and speedy cavalry accounted in part for the success of the Qin dynasty (221 BCE–206 BCE).

The Chinese warhorses were cultivated from the vast herds roaming free on the grassy plains of northeastern China and the Mongolian plateau. The hardy Central Asian horses were generally short-legged with barrel chests. Speed was not anticipated from this configuration, but strength and endurance are characteristic features.

During the Han dynasty (206 BCE–220 CE), records tell of a Chinese expedition to Fergana (in present-day Uzbekistan) and the superior horses which were acquired. The horses were acquired for military use and for breeding.

"Horses are the foundation of military power, the great resources of the state but, should this falter, the state will fall."

– Ma Yuan (14 BCE – 49 CE), a Han dynasty military general and horse expert.

During the Jin dynasty (265–420), records of thousands of "armored horses" illustrate the development of warfare in this period.

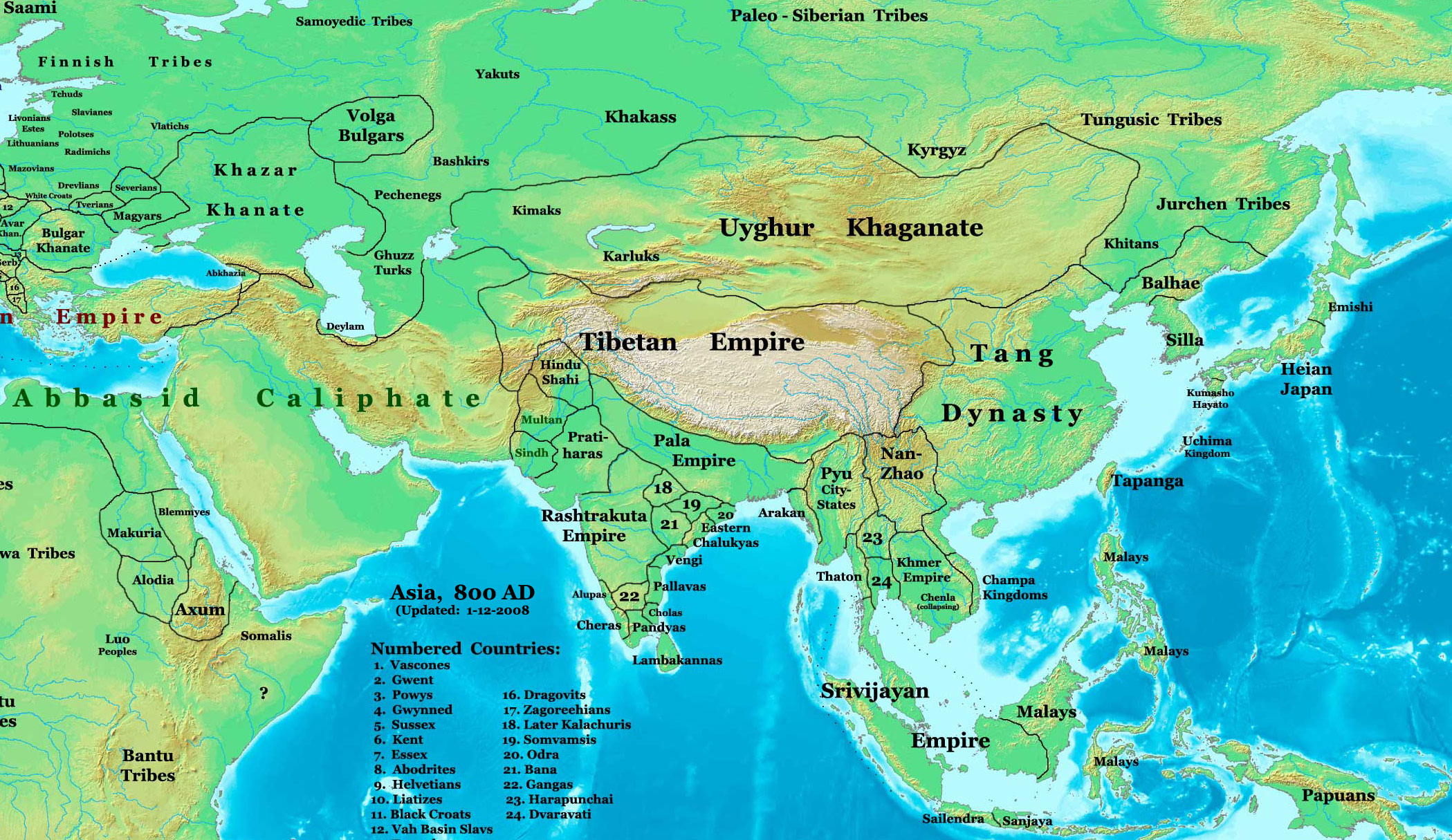
The map of Continental Asia in 800 shows the extent of Tang China's geopolitical power in relation to its neighbors, including the Uighur Empire of Mongolia.

Horses and skilled horsemen were often in short supply in agrarian China, and cavalry were a distinct minority in most Sui dynasty (581–618) and Tang dynasty (618–907) armies. The Imperial herds numbered 325,700 horses in 794.

Throughout the Song (960–1279) all the way to the Ming dynasty (1368–1644), Chinese armies relied on an officially supervised tea-for-horse trading systems which evolved over centuries.

Tea and horses were so inextricably related that officials repeatedly requested that the tea laws and the horse administration be supervised by the same man. From the perspective of the Chinese court, government control of tea was the first step in the creation of a rational and effective policy aimed at improving the quality of horses in the army.

During the military decline of the late Ming dynasty, the marked inferiority of the training & conditioning of Chinese horses was noted by the Italian Jesuit missionary and ambassador Matteo Ricci (1552–1610), who observed:

"[The Chinese] have countless horses in the service of the army, but these are so degenerate and lacking in martial spirit that they are put to rout even by the neighing of the Tartars' steed and so they are practically useless in battle."

==== Japan ====
Most Japanese horses are descended from Chinese and Korean imports, and there was some cross-breeding with indigenous horses which had existed in Japan since the Stone Age. Although records of horses in Japan are found as far back as the Jōmon period, they played little or no role in early Japanese agriculture or military conflicts until horses from the continent were introduced in the 4th century. The Kojiki and Nihon Shoki mention horses in battle.

Amongst the Imperial aristocracy, some were especially renowned for their horsemanship. It was cavalry, not infantry, which proved to be decisive in the Jinshin War of 672–673, in Fujiwara no Hirotsugu's rebellion in 740, and in the revolt of Fujiwara no Nakamaro in 756.

Samurai fought as cavalry for many centuries, and horses were used both as draft animals and for war. The increasingly elaborate decorations on harnesses and saddles of the samurai suggests the value accorded to these war horses.

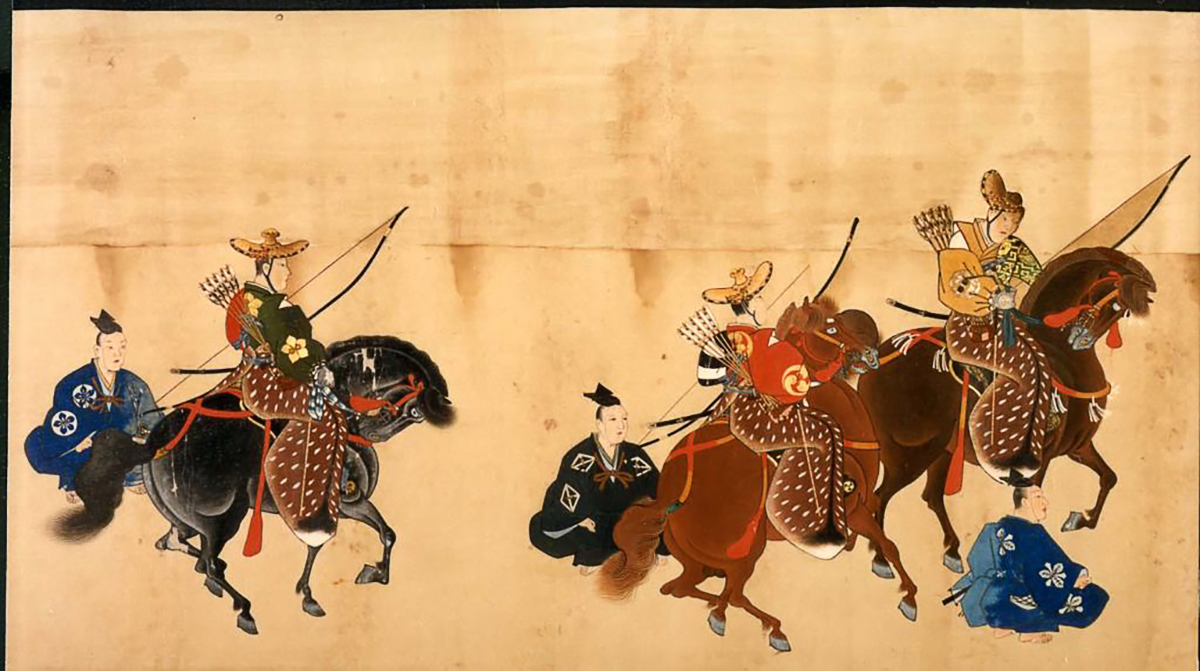
An artistic depiction of Yabusame cavalry archers, Edo period

The samurai were particularly skilled in the art of using archery from horseback. They used methods of training such as yabusame, Japanese horse archers which originated in 530 AD and reached its peak under Minamoto no Yoritomo (1147–1199 AD) in the Kamakura period. The conventions of warfare in Japan switched from an emphasis on mounted bowmen to mounted spearmen during the Sengoku period (1467–1615).

Amongst the samurai, Tokugawa Ieyasu (1543–1616) was known as an excellent horseman, which forms the foundation of an anecdote about the shōgun's character. One day he and his troops had to cross a very narrow bridge over a raging river. All were wondering how he would ride over this dangerous bridge. Ieyasu dismounted, led the horse over the bridge to the other side, and then he re-mounted his steed. At Nikkō, the burial place of the horse ridden by Ieyasu Tokugawa in the Battle of Sekigahara is marked with an inscribed stone.

In pre-Meiji Japan, horses were only considered in a context of warfare and transportation of cargo. As a general rule, non-samurai and women did not ride in a saddle as this was reserved for samurai warriors. However, Tomoe Gozen was an exception to the general rule. The appearance of women and non-samurai on horseback in Meiji period prints represented an innovative development.

Since 1958, a statue of a horse at Yasukuni Shrine has acknowledged the equine contributions in Japanese military actions. Opened, full bottles of water are often left at the statues. Other public memorials in other locations in Japan commemorate horses in Japanese warfare, for example, the Nogi Shrine in Kyoto.

==== Korea ====
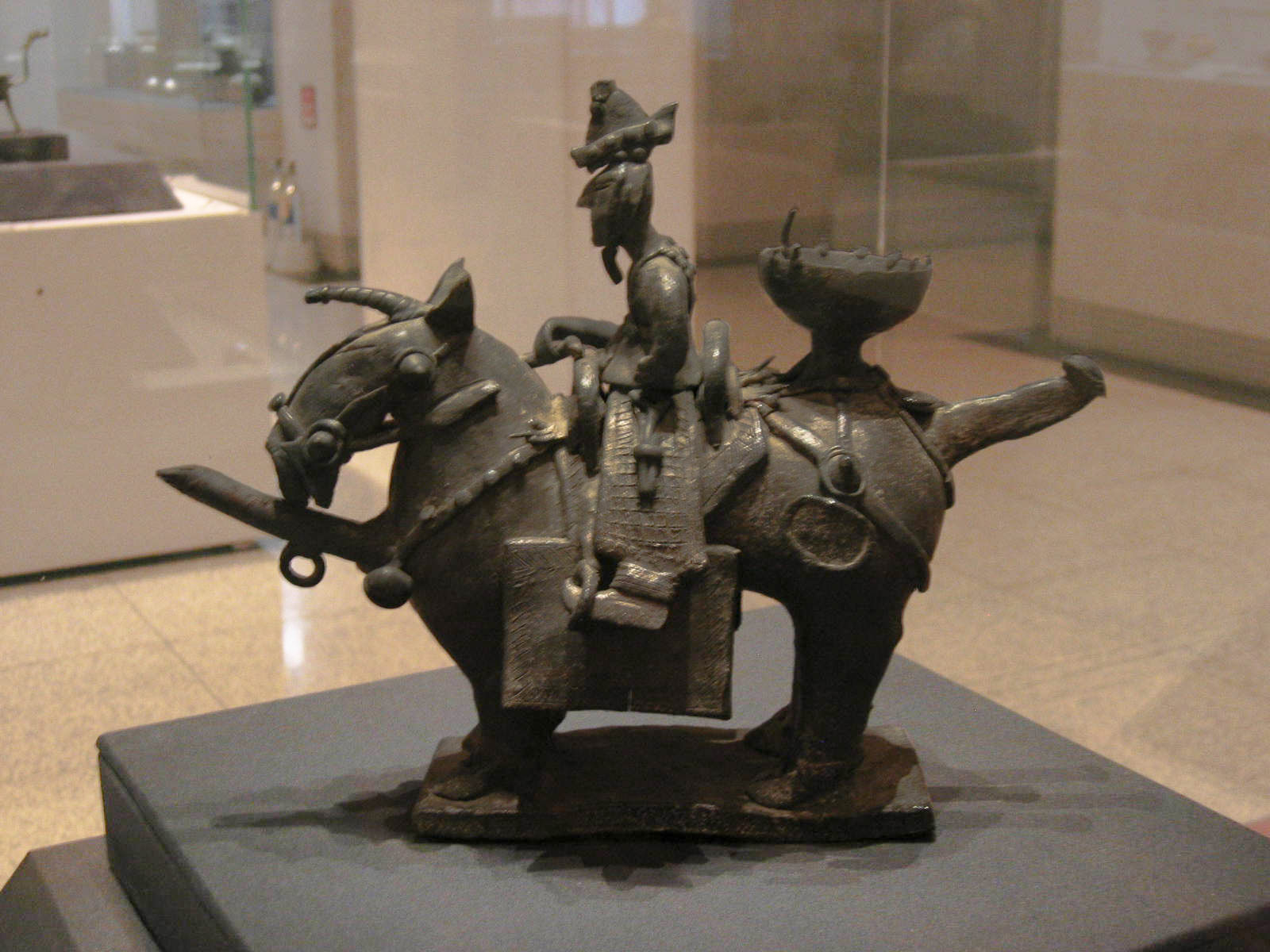
This Silla horse rider pottery is among the National Treasures of Korea

The Korean horse is the smallest of the East Asian breeds, but the breed is very strong and, in terms of its size, has noteworthy stamina.

The earliest horse warfare of Korea was recorded during the ancient Korean kingdom Gojoseon. The influence of northern nomadic peoples and Yemaek peoples on Korean warfare dates from the 3rd century BC. By roughly the 1st century BC, the ancient kingdom of Buyeo also had mounted warriors.

The cavalry of Goguryeo, one of the Three Kingdoms of Korea, were called Gaemamusa (개마무사, 鎧馬武士). King Gwanggaeto the Great often led expeditions into Baekje, Gaya confederacy, Buyeo and against Japanese pirates with his cavalry.

In the 12th century, Jurchen tribes began to violate the Goryeo-Jurchen borders, and eventually invaded Goryeo. After experiencing the invasion by the Jurchen, Korean general Yun Kwan realized that Goryeo lacked efficient cavalry units. He reorganized the Goryeo military into a professional army that would contain decent and well-trained cavalry units.

In 1107, the Jurchen were ultimately defeated, and surrendered to Yun Kwan. To mark the victory, General Yun built nine fortresses to the northeast of the Goryeo-Jurchen borders (동북 9성, 東北 九城).

=== Inner Asia ===
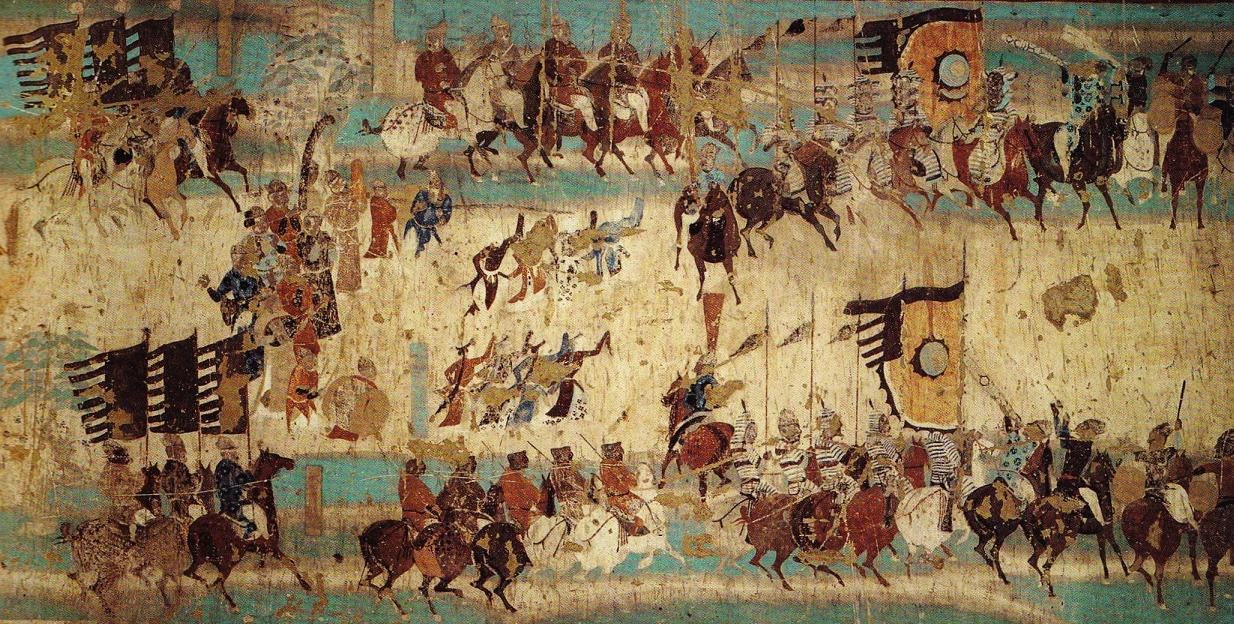
Mural commemorating victory of the Chinese military general and politician Zhang Yichao over the Tibetan Empire in 848 AD. Mogao cave 156, late Tang dynasty

Successive Chinese dynasties had, at various points in history, engaged their nomadic neighbors in combat with reduced effectiveness in cavalry combat, and have a various times instituted reforms to meet a highly-mobile adversary that fought principally on horseback.

One such important reform as clearly recorded in Chinese historical text was King Wuling of Zhao (340 BC - 395 BC), who advocated the principle of 胡服骑射, the "wearing of Hu nomadic people's clothing, and the firing of arrows from horseback" during the Spring and Autumn period, which greatly helped increase combat effectiveness against the cavalries of the nomadic combatants.

Nomadic opponents at the borders of the various successive Chinese empires generally used the horse effectively in warfare, which only slowly developed into changes in the way horses were used.

The Chinese historian, poet, and politician Song Qi (宋祁, 998–1061) explained:

"The reason why our enemies to the north and west are able to withstand China is precisely because they have many horses and their men are adept at riding; this is their strength. China has few horses, and its men are not accustomed to riding; this is China's weakness ... The court constantly tries, with our weakness, to oppose our enemies' strength, so that we lose every battle ... Those who propose remedies for this situation merely wish to increase our armed forces in order to overwhelm the enemy. They do not realize that, without horses, we can never create an effective military force."

==== Mongolia ====
The warhorses of the Mongols were called cerigyn nojan. The wars of Genghis Khan were mounted campaigns; and Mongol horses were better cared for than the horses of their enemies. These horses were well-protected and equipped, including lamellar armour with five parts to safeguard specific parts of the horse.

By 1225, Genghis Khan's empire stretched from the Caspian Sea and northern China. His horses grew to be highly prized throughout Continental Asia as Mongolian horses were known for their sturdiness, endurance, longevity, and stamina. Descendants of Genghis Khan's horses remain in great number in Mongolia.

The limited pasture lands in Eastern Europe affected the westward movement of Mongolian mounted forces during the Mongolian invasions of Eastern Europe.

During World War II, many Mongolian horses were sent to the Soviet Union.

== Horses in logistical support ==
Traditionally, the East Asian horse has been used as a pack animal, essential in providing logistical support for military forces.

== Gallery ==
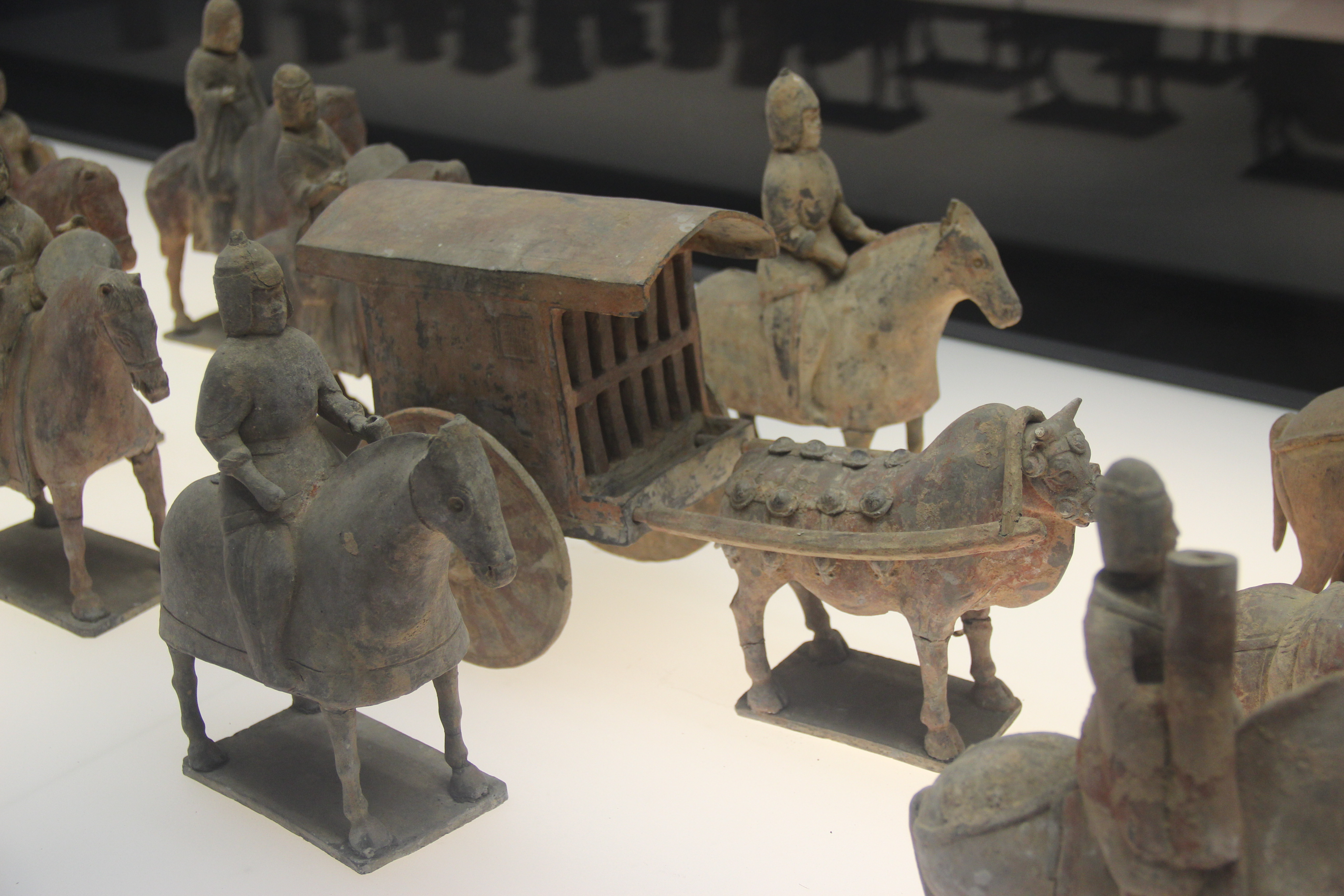
Armoured horses dating back to the Northern Wei period.

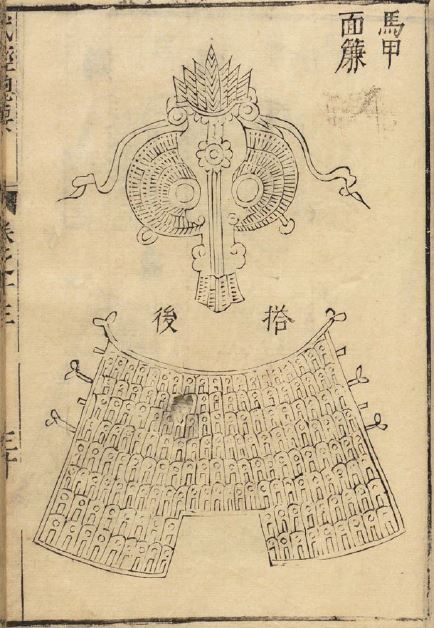
Horse barding as illustrated on Wujing Zongyao

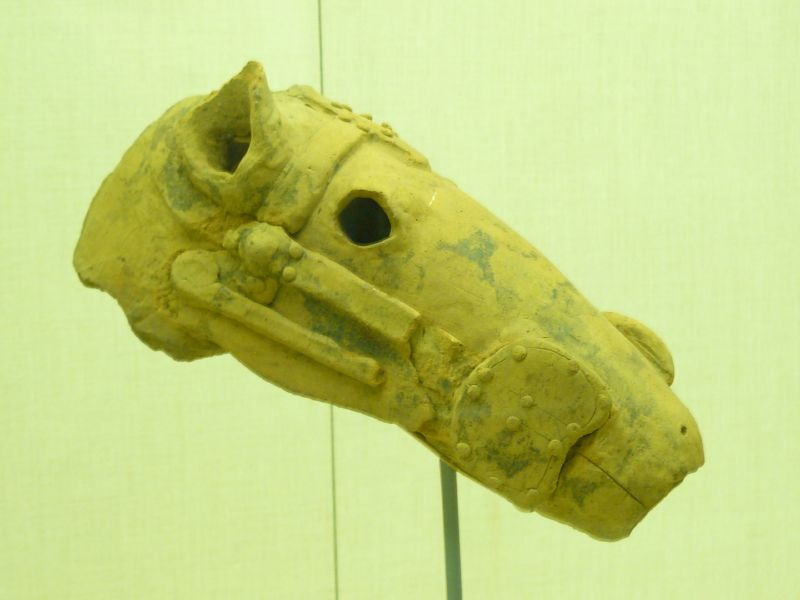
A low-fired 5th to 6th century Kofun and Asuka Japanese earthenware pottery horse head. Brooklyn Museum.

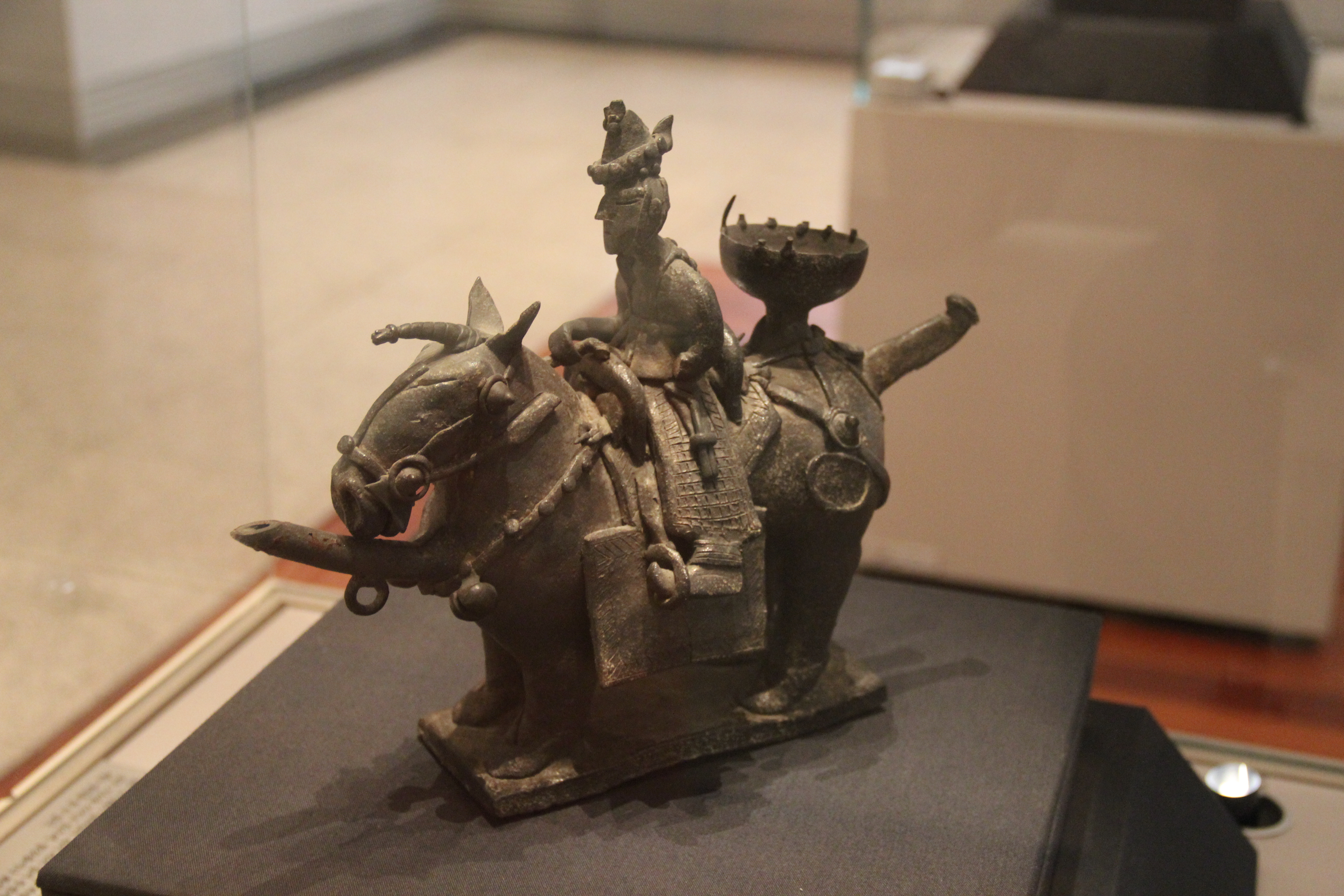
A pottery horse depicting an ancient Silla Korean horse and rider.

== See also ==
- Batak Pony
- Chinese Guoxia
- Chinese Mongolian horse
- Eurasian nomads
- Ferghana horse
- History of the horse in South Asia
- Horses in warfare
- Mongol, 2007 Academy Award nominee
- War of the Heavenly Horses
