= Batič =

#REDIRECT Stojan Batič

Batič may refer to:

- Stojan Batič (1925–2015), Slovenian artist
- Štefka Batič, the subject of the 1923 painting Lacemaker by Veno Pilon

== See also ==
{{surname}}
