= Batik (disambiguation) =

Batik is an Indonesian and Javanese textile coloring technique.

Batik may also refer to:

- Batik (album), 1978 album by Ralph Towner
- Batik (software), a graphics library
- Batik Air, airline in Indonesia
  - Batik Air Malaysia, airline in Malaysia
- Batik Island, Malaysia
- Batik cake, a Malaysian dessert
- Batik, the Tagalog word for Philippine tattoos as well as similar designs in textiles and art

== See also ==
- Batic (disambiguation)
- Batak (disambiguation)
