= Batak pony =

Breed of horse

Batak Pony
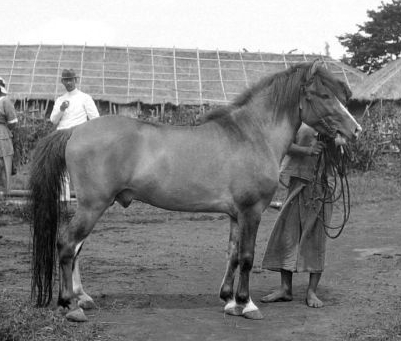
- A Batak stallion, photographed in about 1930
- Other names: Deli
- Country of origin: Indonesia

The Batak pony, also called the Deli pony, is a pony breed from Indonesia. Originating in Central Sumatra, it is thought to have descended from Mongolian Horse and Arabian blood, and has continually been infused with additional Arabian blood to improve its quality. The Batak is selectively breed by the Indonesians, and is often used to upgrade the quality of the horses and ponies on nearby islands.

== Characteristics ==
The ponies are slender, but still strong and sturdy. In general, they are well-conformed, and most of their faults are partly to blame on the poor forage to which they have access. The only other breed of the country which is of better quality is the Sandalwood Pony. The ponies have a fine head with a straight or slightly convex profile. The neck is short and thin, the withers are prominent. The chest and frame are narrow, the back is usually long, and the quarters sloping. The tail is set and carried quite high. The Batak pony is considered a very willing breed, and is quite hardy. They usually average about 11.3 hands (47 inches, 119 cm) but may stand up to 13 hands (52 inches, 132 cm), and are generally brown, but can be any color.

The Batak pony was once used as sacrificial animals for the gods, but is now employed in a less-gruesome occupation as a riding pony. The Arabian blood makes it spirited when needed, but the pony is generally quiet enough for children to ride, with an excellent temperament. Their speed also makes them popular for racing among the local population.

== Origin ==
Horses were introduced to Nusantara archipelago in unknown date, they are descended from Tibetan or Mongol-type horses. It is possible that ancient stocks were brought to Indonesia by the Chinese Tang dynasty in the 7th century, recorded as being given to Dja-va (Kalingga kingdom), Dva-ha-la, and Dva-pa-tan (Bali). Mongolian horses are probably captured during the Mongol invasion of Java (1293). If this true, the Nusantaran ponies would owe much of its roots to the Mongolian horse as well as horses obtained from other areas of western Asia like India and Turkmenistan.

== See also ==
- Horses in East Asian warfare
- Java Pony
- Sumbawa Pony
