= Sumbawa Pony =

Breed of horse

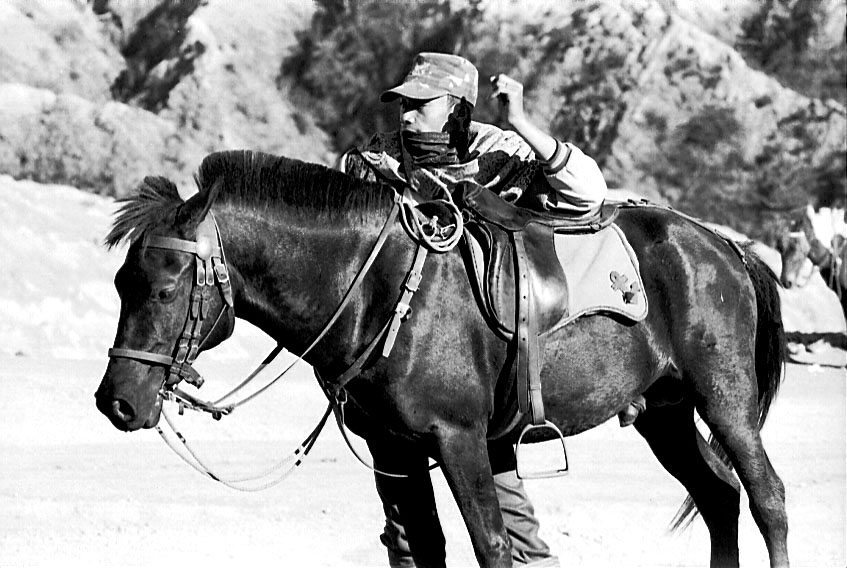
- Sumbawa Pony
- Country of origin: Indonesia

The Sumbawa Pony (Indonesian: kuda-Sumbawa) is a pony breed, named after the island on which they are bred, Sumbawa Island in Indonesia. This breed is very similar to the Sumba or Sandalwood Pony, a breed also developed in these islands, which came from crossing the native ponies on horses of Arabian breeding. The Sumbawa Pony descends from Mongolian Horses and ancient Chinese stock

== Characteristics ==
"Sumbawa", or in Indonesian "kuda-Sumbawa", is the international name for this breed, according to the Food and Agriculture Organization of the United Nations. This pony is known as the Soembawa in Dutch.

Sumbawa ponies are quick, agile, athletic, and fast, with great endurance and a willing temperament. They usually have primitive coloring, with many individual horses being dun with a dorsal stripe and black points, although they may be any color. The Sumba and Sumbawa ponies have a heavy head, short, muscular neck, and low withers. The back is usually long, although it is still strong, and the legs are fine but tough with good hooves. Most ponies do not exceed 12.2 hands (50 inches, 127 cm), and the average height is around 12 hands (48 inches, 122 cm).

== History ==
Very little is known about history of the horse in Southeast Asia, because few studies have been published, and many of those have a European bias. The first serious studies came with Peter Boomgaard in 2004. Horse trading in Sumbawa flourished throughout History, with tough competition between breeders from Sumba, which export the Sandalwood Pony, and those of Sumbawa. There is also competition from breeders from Timor and Savu.

It is likely that Sumbawa horse was introduced to the island by the Javanese people of Majapahit Empire, who conquered the island in the 14th century. The sultans of Bima and West Sumbawa are deemed to possess numerous horses. This breed and the Sumba are supposed to be close from the Mongolian Horse. Although Arabic origin is often cited in ancient documents (including the Dutch ones), there is no evidence of this in Indonesian horses and Sumbawa ponies.

== Uses ==
Sumbawa ponies are today used for packing, riding, and light draft work. They are strong, and many are ridden by men in games of lance throwing despite never reaching 13 hands (52 inches, 132 cm). Young boys also ride the ponies bareback in traditional dance competitions, manuveuring them in patterns as instructed. The legs of the ponies are decorated with bells that chime in rhythm to the drumming.

== See also ==
- List of horse breeds
- Gayo Pony
- Sandalwood Pony

== Bibliography ==
- Bankoff, Greg (2004). "Bestia incognita: The horse and its history in the Philippines 1880–1930". Anthrozoös. 17: 3–25. doi:10.2752/089279304786991873. ISSN 0892-7936. S2CID 143716678.
- Bongianni, Maurizio (1988). "Suffolk Punch". Simon & Schuster's Guide to Horses and Ponies. Translated by Ardèle Dejey. Simon & Schuster. p. 95. ISBN 978-0-671-66068-0. OCLC 16755485.
- Clarence-Smith, William G. (2015). "Breeding and Power in Southeast Asia : Horses, Mules and Donkeys in the Longue Durée" (PDF). Environment, Trade and Society in Southeast Asia. pp. 32–45. doi:10.1163/9789004288058_004. ISBN 9789004288058.
- de Jong Boers, Bernice (2007). "4. The 'Arab' of the Indonesian Archipelago: The Famed Horse Breeds of Sumbawa". Breeds of Empire: The 'Invention' of the Horse in Southern Africa and Maritime Southeast Asia, 1500–1950. Vol. 42 (NIAS studies in Asian topics). Copenhagen: NIAS. pp. 51–64. ISBN 978-8-7769-4014-0.
- Hendricks, Bonnie Lou (2007). International Encyclopedia of Horse Breeds (2nd ed.). Norman: University of Oklahoma Press. pp. 406–407. ISBN 978-0-8061-3884-8. OCLC 154690199., « Sumba »
