= Java Pony =

Indonesian breed of horse

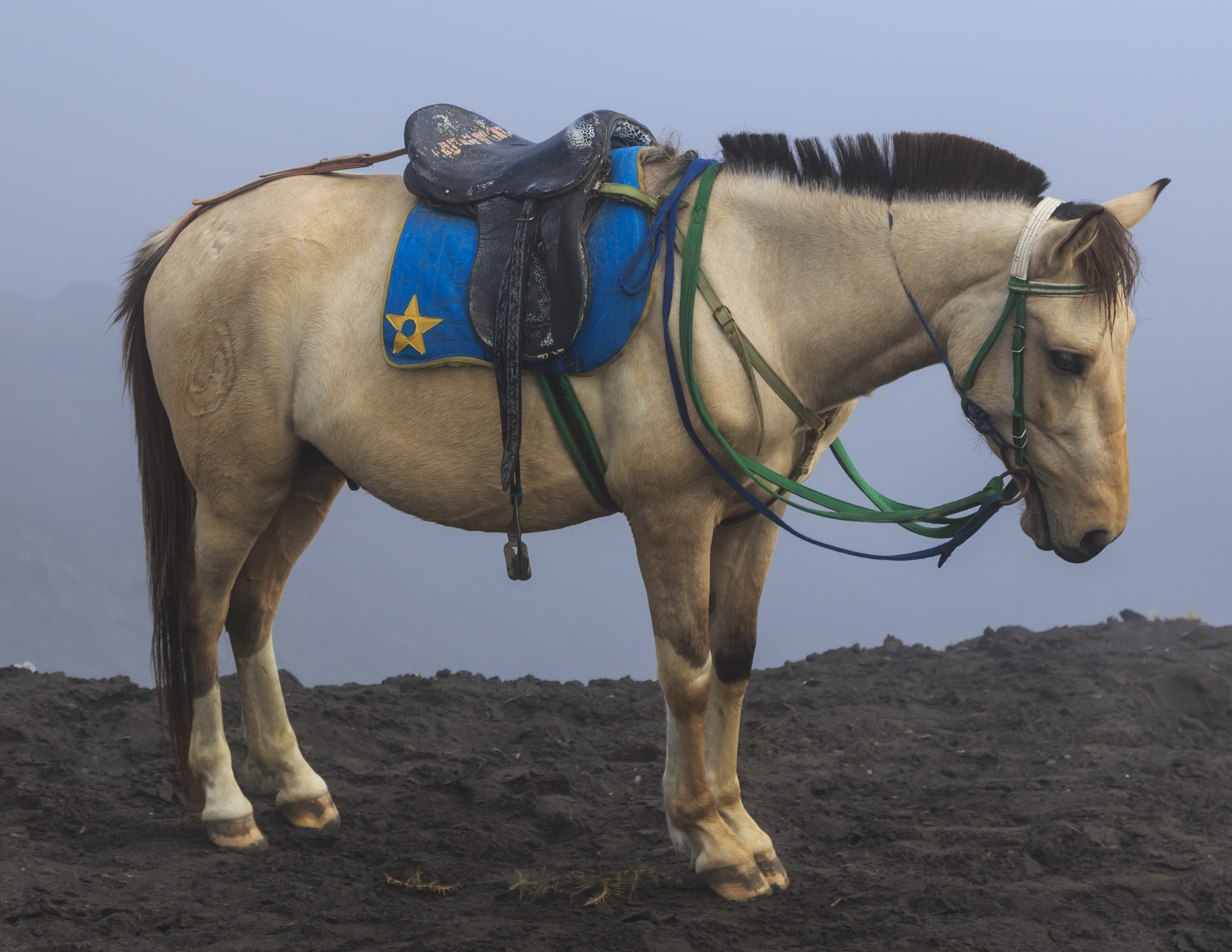
- Java Pony in Indonesia
- Country of origin: Indonesia

The Java pony is a breed of pony developed on the island of Java in Indonesia. It is thought to have descended from wild forebears of Mongolian Wild Horse ancestry. It is larger and stronger than the Timor pony, with more Arabian breed influence.

== Characteristics ==
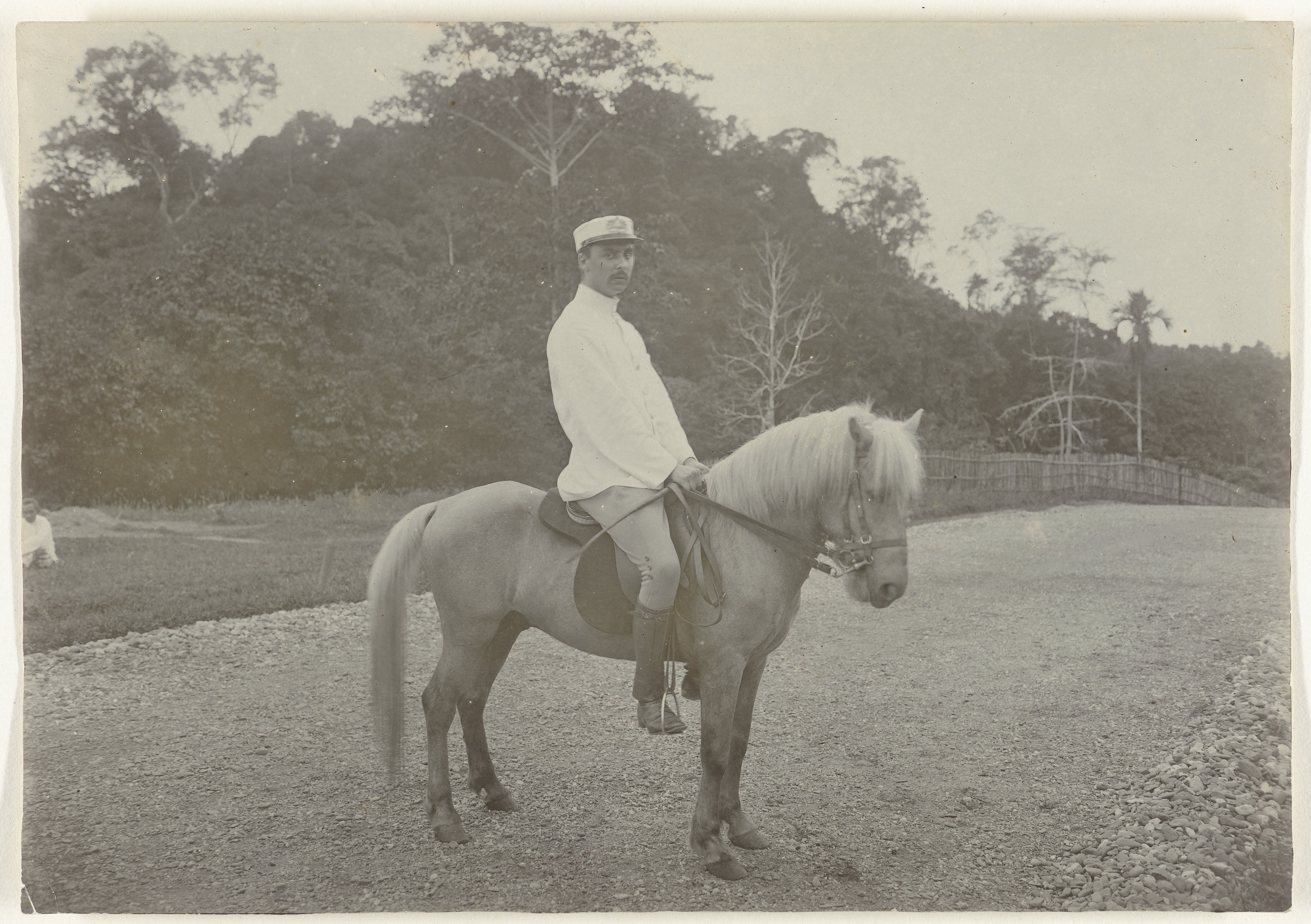
circa 1913

Java ponies belong to the group of Southeast Asian ponies. They are the largest Indonesian horse breed in size, and the least crossed with other breeds. The puny appearance of this pony is due to its often deficient diet. The body is narrow. The head is simple, attractive, with long ears and expressive eyes. The neckline is short and very muscular. The withers are pronounced, the shoulders quite sloping, the chest deep and broad. They tend to have a long back and a slightly sloping rump with a high set tail, no doubt due to their Arabian ancestry. The legs of this breed are of a strange conformation, but surprisingly strong. They have thin bones and poorly developed joints, their feet are hard. The DAD-IS database records an average size of approximately 1.14 m for females and 1.20 m for males. CAB International (2016) indicates an average of 1.27 m. The largest may have reached about 13.5 hands (57 inches, 145 cm).

They are found in a variety of colors, and are a robust breed noted for working ability and endurance. The lightweight conformation of the breed is well-adapted to the tropical climate of Indonesia. The Java Pony is primarily used in agriculture in rural areas and for the transportation of passengers and goods in the cities. They are privately bred throughout the islands, though breeding is in many cases subsidized by the state, and ponies on various islands of Indonesia have noticeable differences in breed characteristics.

== Breed history ==
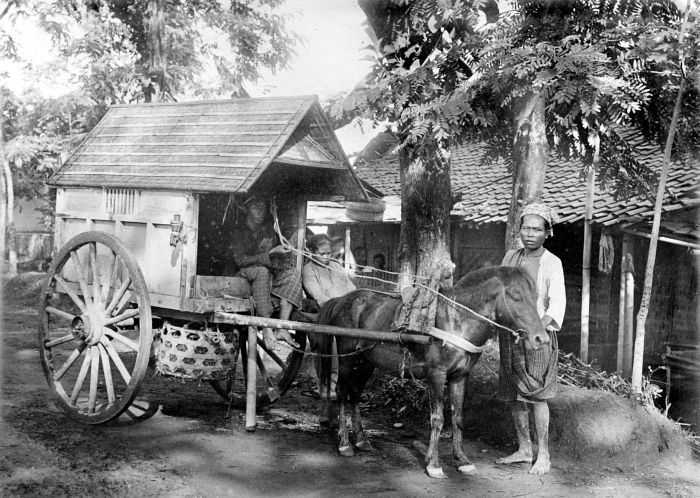
Early 1900s

Horses were introduced to Java in unknown date, they are descended from Tibetan or Mongol-type horses. It is possible that ancient stocks were brought to Indonesia by the Chinese Tang dynasty in the 7th century, recorded as being given to Dja-va (Kalingga kingdom), Dva-ha-la, and Dva-pa-tan (Bali). Mongolian horses are probably captured during the Mongol invasion of Java (1293). If this is true, the Java pony would owe much of its roots to the Mongolian horse as well as horses obtained from other areas of western Asia like India and Turkmenistan.

In the 14th century AD, Java became an important horse breeder and the island was even listed among horse suppliers to China. During the Majapahit period, the quantity and quality of Javanese horse breeds steadily grew. In 1513 CE Tomé Pires praised the highly decorated horses of Javanese nobility, complemented by gold-studded stirrups and lavishly decorated saddles that were "not found anywhere else in the world".

It is likely that Sumbawa horse was introduced to the island by the Javanese people of Majapahit Empire, who conquered the island in the 14th century. The sultans of Bima and West Sumbawa are deemed to possess numerous horses. Sumbawa and the Sumba (Sandalwood) horse are supposed to be close from the Mongolian Horse. Although Arabic origin is often cited in ancient documents (including the Dutch ones), there is no evidence of this in Indonesian horses and Sumbawa ponies.

== See also ==
- List of Indonesian horse breeds
