= Sandalwood Pony =

Breed of horse

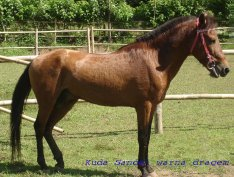
- Sandalwood Pony
- Country of origin: Indonesia

The Sandalwood Pony is a breed of small horse originating from Indonesia, on the Sumba and Sumbawa Islands. It is named after the Sandalwood trees, which are a major export of the country. The Sandalwood pony is one of the finest in the country, partly due to the great amount of Arabian blood. They make suitable children's ponies, and have been exported to Australia for this purpose. They have also been exported to other Southeast Asian countries for use as racing ponies.

The Sandalwood is used for light draft, pack, farm, and riding work. They are especially popular in horse racing, both on the flat and in harness. They are also used in the bareback races held on the islands, which are often over three miles (4.8 km) long.

Sandalwoods have good endurance, and are considered easy to manage. They should have a nice head with small ears, a short, muscular neck, and a deep chest with a sloping shoulder. The back is usually long, and the croup is sloping. The ponies are usually 12–13 hands (48–52 inches, 122–132 cm) and may be any color.

They are said to closely resemble the Batak pony and show influence of their Arabian ancestors. They are fast, and used for racing in local areas.

== History ==
Horses were introduced to Java in an unknown date, they are descended from Tibetan or Mongol-type horses. It is possible that ancient stocks were brought to Indonesia by the Chinese Tang dynasty in the 7th century, recorded as being given to Dja-va (Kalingga kingdom), Dva-ha-la, and Dva-pa-tan (Bali). Mongolian horses are probably captured during the Mongol invasion of Java (1293). If true, the Java pony would owe much of its roots to the Mongolian horse as well as horses obtained from other areas of western Asia like India and Turkmenistan.

In the 14th century AD, Java became an important horse breeder and the island was even listed among horse suppliers to China. During the Majapahit period, the quantity and quality of Javanese horse breeds steadily grew. In 1513 CE Tomé Pires praised the highly decorated horses of Javanese nobility, complemented by gold-studded stirrups and lavishly decorated saddles that were "not found anywhere else in the world".

It is likely that Sumbawa horse was introduced to the island by the Javanese people of Majapahit Empire, who conquered the island in the 14th century. The sultans of Bima and West Sumbawa are deemed to possess numerous horses. Sumbawa and the Sumba (Sandalwood) horse are supposed to be close from the Mongolian Horse. The Sandalwood still occupies a significant place in the Sumbanese culture, ridden by warriors competing at the Pasola festival.

== See also ==
- List of horse breeds
- Java Pony
- Sumbawa Pony
