= Bali Pony =

Horse breed from the island of Bali

Bali pony
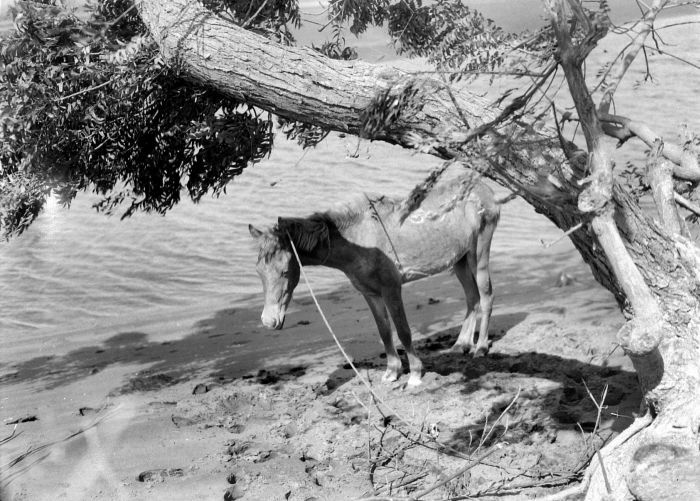
- Country of origin: Indonesia

The Bali pony is an ancient breed now living on the Indonesian island of Bali.

== Characteristics ==
The Bali ponies are quite hardy and self-sufficient, surviving with little outside care. They are tough animals that are not shod and are remarkably sound, with hard feet, and strong legs. The ponies show the usual "primitive markings" such as a dorsal stripe, shoulder bars, and zebra stripes on the legs, in addition to their dun coat, that includes a black mane, tail, and legs.

The ponies lack the traditionally "pretty" conformation, having a large and unrefined head, and upright shoulder that produces short and choppy strides. The chest and back are narrow, although the neck is usually of a good length. The ponies usually range from 12–13 hands (48–52 inches, 122–132 cm). Both the conformation and the coloration produce a pony that looks similar to the Przewalski's Horse.

== Breed history ==
It is possible that ancient stocks were brought to Indonesia by the Chinese Tang dynasty in the 7th century, recorded as being given to Dja-va (Kalingga kingdom), Dva-ha-la, and Dva-pa-tan (Bali). Mongolian horses are probably captured during the Mongol invasion of Java (1293). If this true, the Java pony would owe much of its roots to the Mongolian horse as well as horses obtained from other areas of western Asia like India and Turkmenistan.

In addition to the Mongolian horse, it is known that some Indian stock were taken to Indonesia (although it is unknown exactly which breeds), and the Dutch also brought various eastern breeds to the country during the 18th century. Therefore, the Bali pony likely has been influenced by both the Mongolian horse, and various other eastern breeds.

== Uses ==
The Bali pony has not been selectively bred for any particular set of characteristics. However, they easily perform the tasks required by the native people, including carting coral and stones from the beach. Their strength has also made them a popular mount for trekking and sightseeing tourists.
