= 2025 Indonesia's Horse Racing Season =

- Sport: Horse Racing
- Duration: February 16 - November 9, 2025

Seasons
- 2026 →

The 2025 Indonesia's Horse Racing Season was the national-level Indonesian horse racing season in 2025. There were a total of nine events, held between the 16th of February to the 9th of November in 2025. The events were sanctioned by the Equestrian Association of Indonesia (PORDASI) and ran by event organizers, SARGA.CO. Their official website can be found at sarga.co.

King Argentin, a colt from King Halim Stable jockeyed by Jemmy Runtu, won the Triple Crown in the 2025 season.

== Overview ==
=== Major race results ===
Race			Winner	
Race	Classification	Distance	Horse	Jockey
Classic Races
Triple Crown I	3yo Derby	1200m	King Argentin	Jemmy Runtu
Pertiwi Cup	3yo Fillies	1600m	Princess Gavi	Jemmy Runtu
Triple Crown II	3yo Derby	1600m	King Argentin	Jemmy Runtu
Indonesia Derby	3yo Derby	2000m	King Argentin	Jemmy Runtu
Super Sprint	Class A Sprint	1300m	Princess Gavi	Hanny Suoth
Star of Stars	Class A	2200m	Naga Sembilan	Achmad Saefudin
Non Classics Races
Jateng Derby	3yo Derby Div. I	1600m	Race Voided	
HBX Cup	Open	2000m	Triple's	Meikel Soleran

=== Season summary ===
The 2025 Indonesia's Horse Racing season was the third horse racing season run by SARGA.CO. The original calendar had ten events planned for the year. In the end, there were nine events held throughout the 2025 season. (Note: The A.E. Kawilarang Memorial Cup was held in January 2025, before SARGA.CO announced the 2025 season.)

==== Jateng Derby incident ====
The Jateng Derby was the first event held in the 2025 season. The event was held at Tegalwaton Racecourse in Semarang Regency, Central Java. In the main race of the event, the 3-year-old Derby Division I race, known as the Jateng Derby, an incident occurred that resulted in the deaths of two horses, Milord and Salvator Minang. The accident happened after Salvator Minang's jockey, Yanni Rondowunu, fell from the horse in the first turn entering the homestretch, leaving the horse uncontrollable. Despite becoming an obstruction to the racing line, the race went on. As Milord, the North Sulawesian horse, re-entered the homestretch for the final spurt, he collided head-on with the loose Salvator Minang, who had gone running in the opposite direction. The impact threw Milord's jockey, Jones Paendong, from the saddle. Both jockeys were taken to a nearby hospital for care, whilst the two horses died shortly after the race. The race, which had King Argentin cross the finish line first, was nullified with the prize being divided equally among the 11 racers.

The Jateng Derby Incident led to many horse racing fans from North Sulawesi expressing regret and sadness over the incident and the death of their region's flagship race horse. Many online horse racing fans criticized the lack of competence of both PORDASI and Sarga Co in organizing the event, and expressed the need for better attention to safety procedures. After the incident, PORDASI formalized a new rule stating that a jockey may not compete in more than six races in a single event to ensure better safety.

==== King Argentin winning the Triple Crown ====
The first of the Indonesian Triple Crown races was held on 20 April 2025 in the event BNI Triple Crown Serie 1 & Pertiwi Cup 2025 at Sultan Agung Racecourse, Bantul Regency, DI Yogyakarta. The event also included the Pertiwi Cup, a race exclusive for 3-year-old fillies. Princess Gavi, a horse from King Halim Stable, won the Pertiwi Cup by around 2½ lengths over Naura Ayu. In the 1200m first Triple Crown Race, King Argentin, also from King Halim Stable, won by around 2¼ lengths over Wonder Land.

The second Triple Crown race was held on 18 May 2025, at the Tegalwaton Racecourse, in the Triple Crown Serie 2 2025 event. King Argentin won the 1600m Triple Crown II race in rainy conditions, again with Wonder Land in second place.

Between Triple Crown II and the Indonesia Derby, the IHR Cup 2025 was held on 15 June 2025 at Sultan Agung Racecourse. Notable high stakes races were the 3yo Derby Prospect and Open 2000m races, with Sidney All Star and Naga Sembilan winning them respectively.

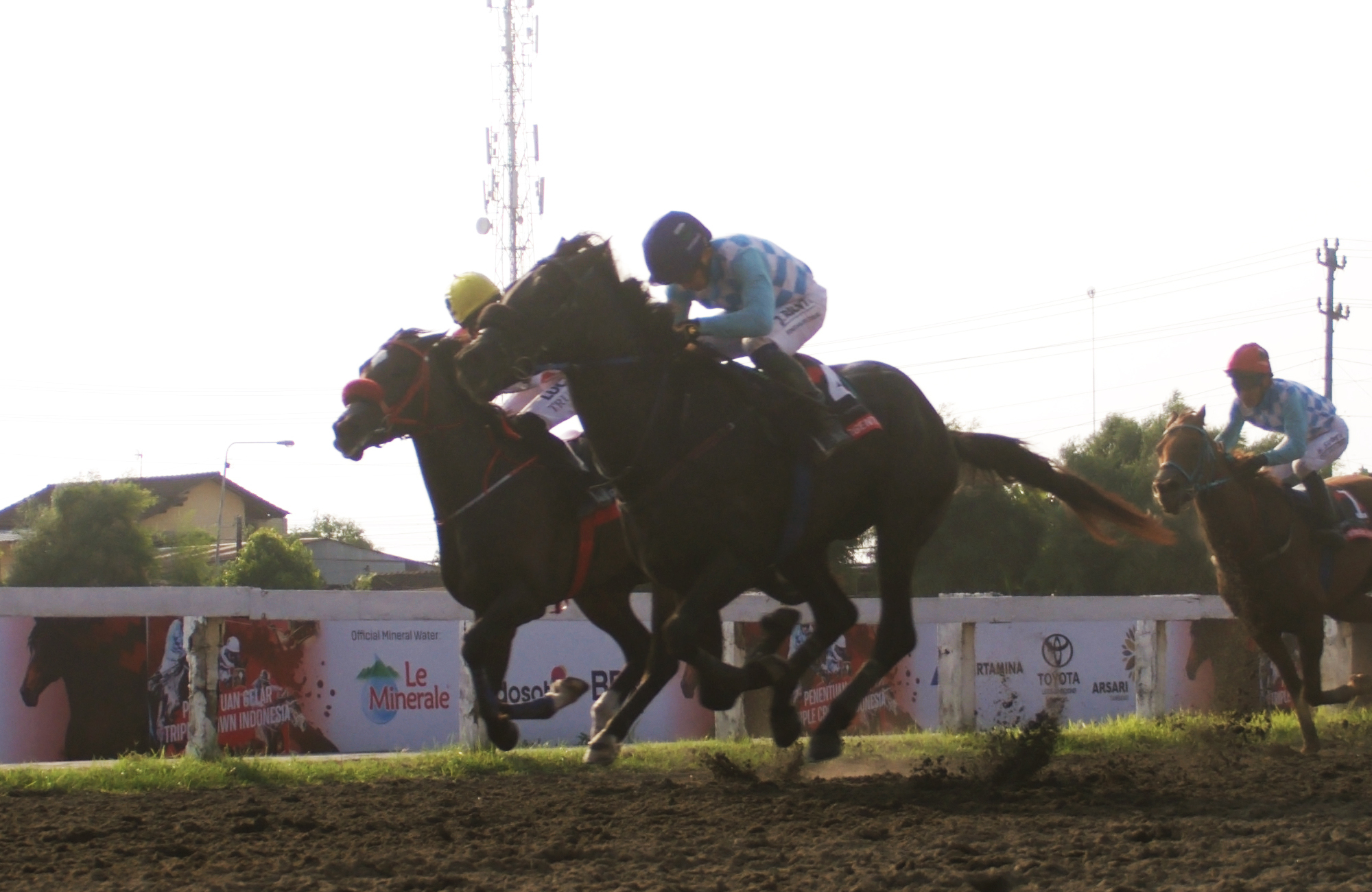
Triple Crown Winner King Argentin (pictured in the Indonesia Derby)

The main event of the season, The Indonesia Derby, was held on 27 July 2025 at Sultan Agung Racecourse. The race had the largest purse of IDR 900,000,000 with the winner receiving IDR 300,000,000. The Derby was the penultimate title deciding race of the Triple Crown. King Argentin, jockeyed by Jemmy Runtu, won by around 4 lengths over Pertiwi Cup winner Princess Gavi, thus earning him the Indonesian Triple Crown. He is the fourth to achieve the title after Djohar Manik (2014), Manik Trisula (2002), and Mystere (1978) (Note: Mystere's Triple Crown win is disputed. Official sites, such as SARGA.CO, list King Argentin as the third winner, and the first colt to do so.), and the second colt to do so.

The Indonesia Derby event was also the 2025 Kejurnas Seri I, the first leg of the 2025 National Championships. After the event, the provincial contingent standings had West Java at first place with 50 points. Following them were Central Java, DK Jakarta, North Sulawesi, and West Sumatra with 41, 33, 23.5, and 15.5 points respectively.

==== Rise in popularity after Umamusume global release ====
Umamusume: Pretty Derby, a Japanese gacha game from the franchise of the same name created by Cygames that centers on anthropomorphized Japanese race horses, released globally in June 2025 and became trending internationally, including in Indonesia. The global release unexpectedly became a catalyst for the revival of the horse racing scene in Indonesia among younger, internet savvy, audiences. The popularity surge introduced fan art of the Indonesian horses as anthropomorphized Umamusume girls, and cosplayers of the characters attending races. SARGA.CO acknowledged the franchise’s influence and has since partnered with several local Umamusume fan communities to promote the sport.

==== Kejurnas Seri II and final events ====
Before Kejurnas Seri II, two other events were held. These were the Merdeka Cup 2025, held at Legokjawa Racecourse, Pangandaran Regency, West Java, as an Independence Day commemorative event, and IHR Cup II 2025, held at Kubu Gadang Racecourse, Payakumbuh, West Sumatra which featured traditional events such as draf bogie (chariot racing) and horseback archery.

Kejurnas Seri II 2025, the second leg of the 2025 National Championships, was held on 19 October 2025 at Sultan Agung Racecourse. Unlike the first leg which classifies races by both height and age, the second leg classifies purely by height (Class A-F). There are two classic races held in the event, which are the Class A Super Sprint (1300m) and the Class A Star of Stars (2200m). The Super Sprint was won by Pertiwi Cup winner Princess Gavi, with the race ending in a photo finish between her and Jakartan race horse, Dominator. The Star of Stars race was won by Naga Sembilan of Red Stone Stable. Naga Sembilan was the first and only Classic race winner in 2025 not from King Halim Stable.

DK Jakarta, who were third place in July, won 52.5 points in Kejurnas II and moved up to first place to win the President of the Republic of Indonesia Cup. The trophy is awarded to overall champions, which is the provincial contingent with the most points from Kejurnas I and II. Jakarta, with 85.5 points, won with a 0.25 margin above runner ups West Java, who had 85.25 points. The third, fourth, and fifth place contingents were Central Java, East Java, and North Sulawesi with 64, 46, and 24.75 points respectively.

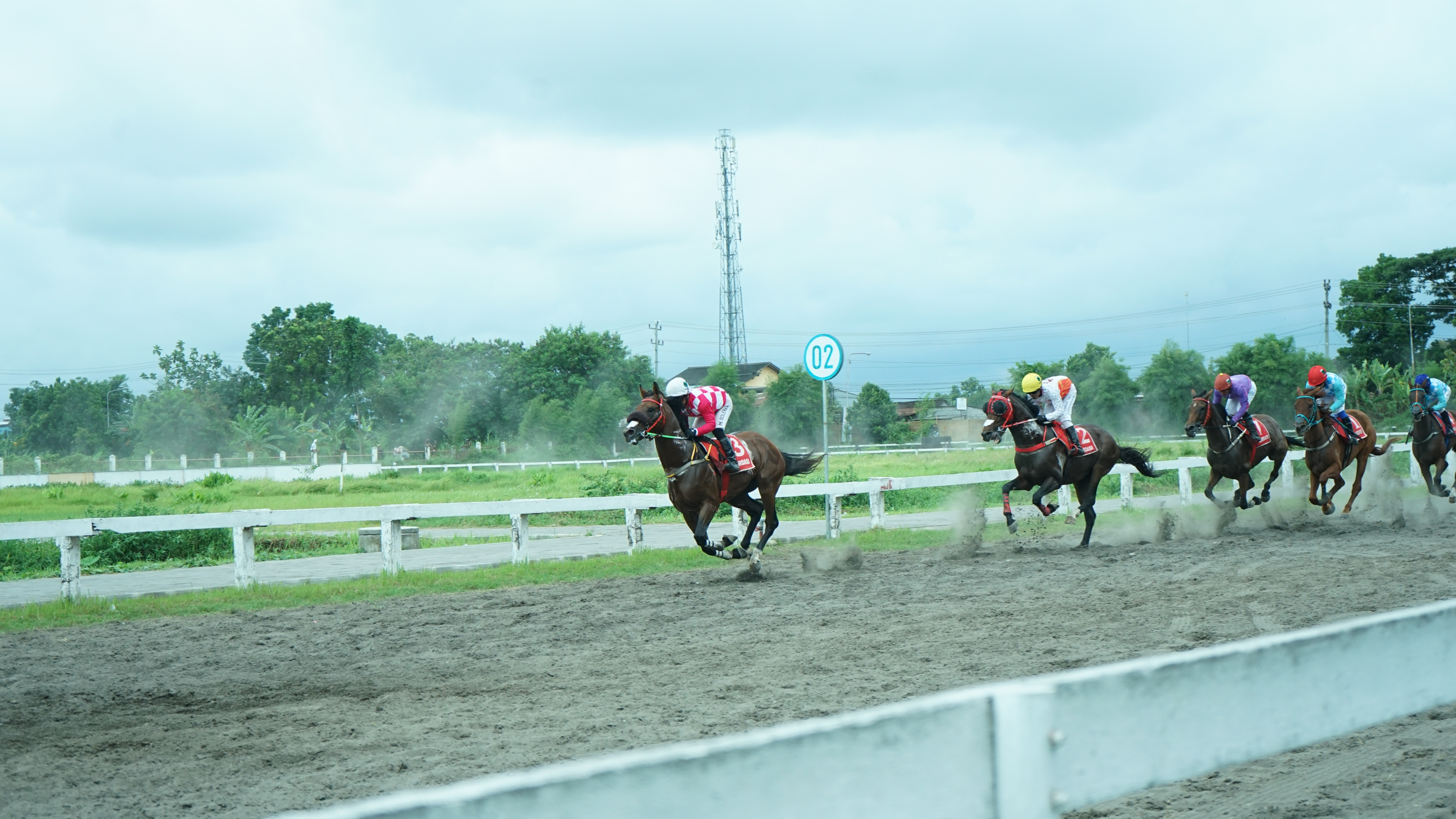
HBX Cup Open 2000m race (Triple's is seen leading the pack)

The final race of the season was the King Hamengku Buwono X Cup (HBX Cup for short). The event was sponsored by the sultan and governor of Yogyakarta, Hamengkubuwono X. The main race, awarding the HBX Cup and IDR 200,000,000, is the Open 2000m. The HBX Cup was won by Triple's, 3 to 4 lengths over King of Istana. The event also included a race of Umamusume cosplayers.

Throughout the season, King Halim Stable won 5 out of 6 Classic races, whilst Eclipse Stable won 27 out of all 151 races.

== Schedule ==
2025 Indonesia's Horse Racing Season
Date	Event	Venue
16 February	Jateng Derby 2025	Tegalwaton Racecourse, Central Java
20 April	BNI Triple Crown Serie 1 & Pertiwi Cup 2025	Sultan Agung Racecourse, DI Yogyakarta
18 May	Triple Crown Serie 2 2025	Tegalwaton Racecourse, Central Java
15 June	IHR Cup 2025	Sultan Agung Racecourse, DI Yogyakarta
27 July	Indonesia Derby (Kejurnas PORDASI Seri I 2025)	Sultan Agung Racecourse, DI Yogyakarta
24 August	Merdeka Cup	Legokjawa Racecourse, West Java
28 September	IHR Cup II 2025	Kubu Gadang Racecourse, West Sumatra
19 October	59th Kejurnas PORDASI Seri II 2025	Sultan Agung Racecourse, DI Yogyakarta
9 November	King Hamengku Buwono X Cup 2025	Sultan Agung Racecourse, DI Yogyakarta

== Results ==
There were a total of nine events.

- **Bold** = Main Race
- Gold = Classics Race

=== Jateng Derby 2025 ===
Venue: Tegalwaton Racecourse

Race		Winner						Purse
Classification	Distance	Horse	Contingent	Jockey	Trainer	Owner	Stable	Purse
Class G	1000m	Larasti	Central Java	Eko Budi Santoso	Rulli Soleran	Cristandy Suryanto	King Stable	IDR 4,000,000
Class F	1000m	Mojang Siliwangi	West Java	Fanny Lepa	Tenny Rori	Lyra Sabria	Aragon Stable	IDR 2,500,000
2yo Maiden A/B	1000m	Nara Eclipse	Central Java	Meikel Soleran	Rulli Soleran	Ir. Iman Hartono	Eclipse Stable	IDR 15,000,000
2yo Junior C/D	1000m	Kana Eclipse	Central Java	Meikel Soleran	Rulli Soleran	Ir. Iman Hartono	Eclipse Stable	IDR 15,000,000
Class D Sprint	1000m	Ravelio	DK Jakarta	Ended Rahmad	Heri Rukmana	H. Topan Firmansyah	Batu Kereta Stable	IDR 10,000,000
2yo Junior A/B	1000m	Shogun Eclipse	Central Java	Meikel Soleran	Venty Pantow	Aryo P.S. Djojohadikusumo	Eclipse Stable	IDR 20,000,000
Class C Sprint	1100m	Dragon dh. Arumpalaka	East Java	Angel Manarisip	Nicky Pantow	Saiful & Lukman	Bintang Madura Stable	IDR 15,000,000
Class E	1200m	Harata Eclipse	Central Java	Meikel Soleran	Venty Pantow	Ir. Iman Hartono	Eclipse Stable	IDR 7,500,000
Open Sprint	1300m	Bintang Maja	DK Jakarta	Ended Rahmad	M. Dani	H. Obeng Sobari	Jalu Stable	IDR 25,000,000
3yo Juve. Div.II	1400m	Citra Laksmi	West Java	Abdul Majid	Dani Saddak	Lyra Sabria	Aragon Stable	IDR 20,000,000
3yo Juve. Div.I	1400m	Princess Gavi	West Java	Jemmy Runtu	Karlan	Kusnadi Halim	King Halim Stable	IDR 30,000,000
Class D	1400m	Telephony Love T.A	Central Java	Yanni Rondonuwu	Muchamad Rizal	Sigit Bidong Samsu	Tombo Ati Stable	IDR 10,000,000
2yo Maiden C/D Heat I	800m	Sofa Maja dh. Greatfull Sion	DK Jakarta	Ended Rahmad	M. Dani	H. Obeng Sobari	Jalu Stable	IDR 10,000,000
Open	2000m	King Of Istana	East Java	Angel Manarisip	Nicky Pantow	H. Yusron	Istana Stable	IDR 25,000,000
2yo Maiden C/D Heat II	800m	Sienna	East Java	Yonatan Langi	Ndena Ngara	Atan Janatan	Jatinom Indah	IDR 8,000,000
3yo Derby Div.II	1600m	Manik Siwa	West Java	Joulan Maleke	Tenny Rori	Lyra Sabria	Aragon Stable	IDR 45,000,000
Class C	1600m	Ms Queen	North Sulawesi	Jones Paendong	Steven Paendong	Andrea N. Supit	Miranda Stable	IDR 15,000,000
**3yo Derby Div. I (Jateng Derby)**	1600m	Race Voided (Note: Race voided due to accident between Milord and Salvator Minang. Both horses were killed in the accident.)						IDR 100,000,000

=== Triple Crown Serie 1 & Pertiwi Cup 2025 ===
Venue: Sultan Agung Racecourse

Race		Winner						Purse
Classification	Distance	Horse	Contingent	Jockey	Trainer	Owner	Stable	Purse
Class F	1000m	Bintang Junior	South Kalimantan	Agung Saidil Adha	Ardhi Wijaya	Hj. Haryati	BHM Stable	IDR 15,000,000
2yo Maiden A/B	1000m	Kenangan Sion	North Sulawesi	Fajar Walangitan	Wahono AT	Roy Irawan Diatmiko	Djon's Stable	IDR 20,000,000
Maiden KPI	1000m	Oshin Eclipse	Central Java	Meikel Soleran	Rulli Soleran	Ir. Iman Hartono	Eclipse Stable	IDR 20,000,000
2yo Junior C/D Div.I	1000m	Kana Eclipse	Central Java	Hesky Paendong	Rulli Soleran	Ir. Iman Hartono	Eclipse Stable	IDR 25,000,000
Class D Sprint	1000m	Sitaro Nagari	South Kalimantan	Agung Saidil Adha	Ardhi Wijaya	Hj. Haryati	BHM Stable	IDR 25,000,000
Class C Sprint	1100m	Dragon	East Java	Angel Manarisip	Nicky Pantow	Saiful & Lukman	Bintang Madura Stable	IDR 30,000,000
Class A Sprint	1300m	Queen Divona	West Java	Hanny Suoth	Farooq Ali Khan	Kusnadi Halim	King Halim Stable	IDR 50,000,000
Class D	1400m	Amaranggana	West Java	Joulan Maleke	Tenni Rori	Lyra Sabria	Aragon Stable	IDR 25,000,000
3yo Juve. Div.II	1400m	Esperance Tonsea	North Sulawesi	Valen Wongkar	Heyke Turangan	Rosana Thanos	Tonsea Stable	IDR 35,000,000
3yo Juve. Div.I	1400m	Kamaka Eclipse	Central Java	Hesky Paendong	Rulli Soleran	Ir. Imam Hartono	Eclipse Stable	IDR 100,000,000
Class E	1200m	P. Musang King dh. Jundi Batu Balang	South Kalimantan	Agung Saidil Adha	Ardhi Punta Wijaya	Hj. Haryati	BHM Stable	IDR 15,000,000
2yo Junior A/B	1200m	Tokugawa Eclipse	Central Java	Hesky Paendong	Rulli Soleran	Ir. Iman Hartono	Eclipse Stable	IDR 35,000,000
**3yo Derby (Triple Crown I)**	1200m	King Argentin	West Java	Jemmy Runtu	Farooq Ali Khan	Kusnadi Halim	King Halim Stable	IDR 200,000,000
3yo+ Indonesian Throroughbreds	1600m	Lord Montjeu T.A	Central Java	Aldy Tumewu	Muchamad Rizal	M. Ervan M. Ersan	Tombo Ati Stable	IDR 40,000,000
Class C	1600m	Quana Eclipse	Central Java	Meikel Soleran	Rulli Soleran	Ir. Iman Hartono	Eclipse Stable	IDR 30,000,000
**3yo Fillies (Pertiwi Cup)**	1600m	Princess Gavi	West Java	Jemmy Runtu	Farooq Ali Khan	Kusnadi Halim	King Halim Stable	IDR 200,000,000
2yo Maiden C/D	800m	Alenza All Star	North Sulawesi	Fajar Walangitan	Wahono AT	Roy Irawan Djatmiko	Djon's Stable	IDR 15,000,000
Open	2000m	King Of Istana	East Java	Angel Manarisip	Nicky Pantow	H. Yusron	Istana Stable	IDR 70,000,000

=== Triple Crown Serie 2 2025 ===
Venue: Tegalwaton Racecourse

Race		Winner						Purse
Classification	Distance	Horse	Contingent	Jockey	Trainer	Owner	Stable	Purse
2yo Maiden A/B	1000m	Rajo Pasopati	DI Yogyakarta	Raymond Tambaani	Trully Pantow	Alfiandra Yahya Putra	Diangkar Bumi Stable	IDR 15,000,00
2yo Junior C/D Div.II	1000m	Red Ricee	North Sumatra	Yanni Rondowunu	J. Suranta	Joko Prabowo	SSC - Hawwa Farm	IDR 10,000,000
2yo Junior C/D	1000m	Maxi Of Khalim	West Java	Genta T. Dinanta	Karlan	Kusnadi Halim	King Halim Stable	IDR 15,000,000
Class F	1000m	Lang Lang Jagad T.A	Central Java	Agus Setiono	Muchamad Rizal	M. Ervan M. Ersan	Tombo Ati Stable	IDR 7,500,000
Class E	1200m	Artemis	West Java	Abdul Majid	Dani Saddak	Osmar Devara	Dago Stable	IDR 7,500,000
Class D	1200m	Ravelio	DK Jakarta	Ended Rahmad	Heri Rukmana	H. Topan Firmansyah	Batu Kereta Stable	IDR 15,000,000
2yo Junior A/B	1200m	Nara Eclipse	Central Java	Meikel Soleran	Rulli Soleran	Ir. Iman Hartono	Eclipse Stable	IDR 20,000,000
2yo Junior KPI	1200m	Oshin Eclipse	Central Java	Meikel Soleran	Rulli Soleran	Ir. Iman Hartono	Eclipse Stable	IDR 15,000,000
Indonesian Thoroughbreds	1200m	Star Montjeu T.A	Central Java	Agus Setiono	Jendri Turangan	M. Ervan M. Ersan	Tombo Ati Stable	IDR 20,000,000
Foreign Thoroughbreds	1200m	Cronos Eclipse	Central Java	Hesky Paendong	Rulli Soleran	Ir. Iman Hartono	Eclipse Stable	IDR 15,000,000
Class C	1300m	Quana Eclipse	Central Java	Meikel Soleran	Rulli Soleran	Ir. Iman Hartono	Eclipse Stable	IDR 20,000,000
Open Sprint	1300m	Azarya Eclipse	Central Java	Meikel Soleran	Rulli Soleran	Ir. Iman Hartono	Eclipse Stable	IDR 30,000,000
3yo Juve. Div.II	1400m	Dobhan Prasasti	Central Java	Angel Manarisip	Nicky Pantow	Indra Prawita Alam	Prasasti Stable	IDR 20,000,000
3yo Juve. Div.I	1400m	Kamaka Eclipse	Central Java	Hesky Paendong	Rulli Soleran	Ir. Iman Hartono	Eclipse Stable	IDR 30,000,000
3yo Derby Div.II	1600m	Surya Whyschia dh. Guangzou Nagari	East Java	Renaldi Ratu	Slamet	Nona Whyscia	Halaman 60 Whyscia Stable	IDR 45,000,000
**3yo Derby (Triple Crown II)**	1600m	King Argentin	West Java	Jemmy Runtu	Karlan	Kusnadi Halim	King Halim Stable	IDR 100,000,000
Class A Open	2000m	King Of Istana	East Java	Angel Manarisip	Nicky Pantow	H. Yusron	Istana Stable	IDR 30,000,000
2yo Junior C/D	800m	Luna Nova	Central Java	M Komarudin	Kusno Brilliantoro	Dedi Iryanto	Langgeng Stable	IDR 10,000,000

=== IHR Cup 2025 ===
Venue: Sultan Agung Racecourse

Race		Winner						Purse
Classification	Distance	Horse	Contingent	Jockey	Trainer	Owner	Stable	Purse
Class I/J	1000m	Al Malika AJ	Central Java	M Rezan	Afl Pincuk	Zaenal Efendi	Atma Jaya Stable	IDR 5,000,000
Class G/H	1000m	Bless Virginia	South Kalimantan	Agung Saidil	Raymond Tambaani	Sheila Putri Mahardika	BHM Stable	IDR 5,000,000
2yo Junior C/D Div.II	1000m	Putri Barbara	South Kalimantan	Agung Saidil	Ardhe Wijaya	Sheila Putri Mahardika	BHM Stable	IDR 10,000,000
2yo Junior C/D Div.I	1000m	Geneva Allstar	North Sulawesi	Stevi Tongkeles	Bosco Sondakh	William Sutiono	All Star Stable	IDR 15,000,000
Class F	1000m	Kasmaran	Aceh	Agung Saidil	Ardhi Wijaya	Toschad Cipta Herdani	Adem Ayem Stable	IDR 10,000,000
2yo Maiden A/B	1000m	P. Jack Jhon	South Kalimantan	Agung Saidil	Ardhi Wijaya	Sheila Putri Mahardika	BHM Stable	IDR 10,000,000
Class E	1200m	Harata Eclipse	Central Java	Meikel Soleran	Venty Pantow	Ir. Iman Hartono	Eclipse Stable	IDR 10,000,000
Class D	1200m	Lovely Sion	South Kalimantan	Risky Rorimpandey	Raymond Tambaani	Sheila Putri Mahardika	BHM Stable	IDR 15,000,000
2yo Junior A/B	1200m	Shogun Eclipse	Central Java	Meikel Soleran	Venty Pantow	Ir. Iman Hartono	Eclipse Stable	IDR 20,000,000
Indonesian Thoroughbreds	1200m	She's Coming	Central Java	Abdul Majid	Dani Saddak	Lyra Sabria	Aragon Stable	IDR 20,000,000
Foreign Thoroughbreds	1200m	Cronos Eclipse	Central Java	Hesky Paendong	Rulli Soleran	Ir. Iman Hartono	Eclipse Stable	IDR 15,000,000
Class C	1300m	Quana Eclipse	Central Java	Meikel Soleran	Rulli Soleran	Ir. Iman Hartono	Eclipse Stable	IDR 20,000,000
Open Sprint	1300m	Azarya Eclipse	Central Java	Meikel Soleran	Rulli Soleran	Ir. Iman Hartono	Eclipse Stable	IDR 50,000,000
3yo Juvenile Prospects	1400m	P. Hajar	South Kalimantan	Riski Rorimpandey	Raymond Tambaani	Sheila Putri Mahardika	BHM Stable	IDR 30,000,000
Class B	1850m	Prince Patriot	DI Yogyakarta	Yanni Rondonuwu	Rudi Ratu	Endang Sri Rejeki	Billion 99 Stable	IDR 40,000,000
3yo Derby Prospects	1850m	Sidney All Star	North Sulawesi	Fajar Walangitan	Wahono AT	Roy Irawan Djatmiko	Djon's Stable	IDR 70,000,000
Open	2000m	Naga Sembilan	DK Jakarta	Achmad Saefudin	Bagus Hariyanto	Raihanah Bagus	Red Stone Stable	IDR 70,000,000
2yo Maiden C/D	800m	Fiona Of Khalim	West Java	Genta T. Dinata	Karlan	Kusnadi Halim	King Halim Stable	IDR 10,000,000

=== Indonesia Derby (Kejurnas PORDASI Seri I 2025) ===
Venue: Sultan Agung Racecourse

Race		Winner						Purse
Classification	Distance	Horse	Contingent	Jockey	Trainer	Owner	Stable	Purse
Non Kejurnas
Class F	1000m	Kasmaran	DK Jakarta	Agung Saidil Adha	Ardhi Wijaya	H. Yudi Bireun	Adem Ayem Stable	IDR 20,000,000
2yo Junior C/D (non-finalists)	1200m	Fiona Of Khalim	West Java	Genta T. Dinata	Karlan	Kusnadi Halim	King Halim Stable	IDR 20,000,000
Class E	1200m	Predator Istana dh. RX King	East Java	Angel Manarisip	Nicky Pantow	H. Yusron	Istana Stable	IDR 20,000,000
Class D	1200m	P. Musang King	South Kalimantan	Salman Farid	Ardhi Punta Wijaya	Sheila Putri	BHM Stable	IDR 25,000,000
Class A Open Sprint	1300m	Dominator dh. King Talago	DK Jakarta	Esra Tamunu	Ardhi Punta Wijaya	Djatmiko Adi Nugroho	Ciello Stable	IDR 40,000,000
Class C	1300m	Dragon dh. Arumpalaka	East Java	Renaldy Ratu	Jhony Ratu	Saiful & Lukman	Bintang Madura Stable	IDR 30,000,000
2yo Junior A/B (non-finalists)	1400m	Kimberly	East Java	M. Rezan	Nicky Pantow	Drs. H. Sentot DJ	Nona Cindy Stable	IDR 20,000,000
3yo Juvenile (non-finalists)	1600m	P. Hajar	South Kalimantan	Salman Farid	Ardhi Punta Wijaya	Sheila Putri	BHM Stable	IDR 20,000,000
3yo Derby (non-finalists)	2000m	Naura Ayu	East Java	Bramantio Turangan	Agus Widodo	Bambang K. Istanto	Amigo Stable	IDR 20,000,000
Class A Open	2000m	Queen Divona	West Java	Hany Suoth	Karlan	Chen Kwo Kwai	King Halim Stable	IDR 50,000,000
Kejurnas
2yo Junior C/D	1200m	Kana Eclipse	Central Java	Meikel Soleran	Rulli Soleran	Ir. Iman Hartono	Eclipse Stable	IDR 75,000,000
2yo Junior A/B	1400m	Maxi Of Khalim	West Java	Jemmy Runtu	Karlan	Kusnadi Halim	King Halim Stable	IDR 150,000,000
2y Indonesian Thoroughbreds	1400m	Sunglow Nagari	East Kalimantan	Yoshua Meikel Rori	Novi Telew	H. Rahmad Mas'ud	Winning Stable	IDR 50,000,000
3yo+ Indonesian Throroughbreds	1600m	Lord Montjeu T.A	Central Java	Meikel Soleran	Muchamad Rizal	M. Ervan M. Ersan	Tombo Ati Stable	IDR 75,000,000
3yo Juvenile	1600m	Caraxes Nagari	North Sulawesi	Tripan Eri	Wahono AT	Roy Irawan Djatmiko	Djon's Stable	IDR 150,000,000
4y Class C/D	1600m	Arceus Nagari	DK Jakarta	Achmad Saefudin	Wahyu Wicaksono	Aryo P.S Djojo	Sarga Stable	IDR 60,000,000
**3yo Derby (Indonesia Derby)**	2000m	King Argentin	West Java	Jemmy Runtu	Karlan	Kusnadi Halim	King Halim Stable	IDR 300,000,000
4y Class A/B	2000m	Naga Sembilan dh. Leonidas	DK Jakarta	Achmad Saefudin	Bagus Hariyanto	Raihanah Bagus	Red Stone Stable	IDR 75,000,000

=== Merdeka Cup 2025 ===
Venue: Legokjawa Racecourse

Race		Winner						Purse
Classification	Distance	Horse	Contingent	Jockey	Trainer	Owner	Stable	Purse
3yo Maiden C/D	1000m	Rastaban	West Java	Abdul Majid	Dani Sadak	Lyra Sabria	Aragon Stable	IDR 20,000,000
Class F	1000m	Kasmaran	DK Jakarta	Agung Saidil	Ardhi Wijaya	Suwandi	Maju Jaya Stable	IDR 15,000,000
Class D Sprint	1000m	Ravelio	DK Jakarta	Ended Rahmad	Heri Rukmana	H. Topan Firmansyah	Batu Kereta Stable	IDR 25,000,000
Class C Sprint	1100m	Cansu	West Java	Rizki Nugraha	Jhony Ratu	H. Tatang Budiman	Kamojang Stable	IDR 30,000,000
Class E	1200m	Putra Raja	West Java	Dedi Suswanto	Tenny Rori	Lyra Sabria	Aragon Stable	IDR 20,000,000
3yo KPI	1200m	Rajadewi	West Java	Joulan Maleke	Tenny Rori	Lyra Sabria	Aragon Stable	IDR 30,000,000
3yo Juvenile Prospects	1200m	Fiona Of Khalim	West Java	Genta T. Dinata	Karlan	Kusnadi Halim	King Halim Stable	IDR 40,000,000
Class D	1400m	Sultan Nagari	West Java	Brendy Sondakh	Tenny Rori	Lyra Sabria	Aragon Stable	IDR 25,000,000
3yo Derby Prospects	1400m	Aurora Of Khalim	West Java	Hany South	Karlan	Kusnadi Halim	King Halim Stable	IDR 60,000,000
Class C	1600m	Yuwaraja	West Java	Syaeful Firmandani	Dani Saddak	Lyra Sabria	Aragon Stable	IDR 30,000,000
Indonesian Thoroughbreds	1600m	She's Coming	West Java	Abdul Majid	Dani Saddak	Lyra Sabria	Aragon Stable	IDR 30,000,000
Open Sprint	1300m	War Kudeta	West Java	Hany South	Karlan	Kusnadi Halim	King Halim Stable	IDR 60,000,000
Class J	1000m	Mc Queen	West Java	M. Ikbal	Tantan Firmansyah	Edlyn	Van Doeloer Stable	IDR 10,000,000
Class I	1000m	Putra DNA	West Java	Wawan Gunawan	Andang Rahmat	Tania Yemima	DNA Stable	IDR 10,000,000
Class H	1000m	Arbay Star	Central Java	Agus Setiono	Slamet Riyadi	Anindya & AR Dara	AR Team	IDR 10,000,000
Class G	1000m	Naga Maja	DK Jakarta	Erza Rustandi	M. Dani	H. Obeng Sobari	Jalu Stable	IDR 10,000,000

=== IHR Cup II 2025 ===
Venue: Kubu Gadang Racecourse

Race		Winner						Purse
Classification	Distance	Horse	Contingent	Jockey	Trainer	Owner	Stable	Purse
Extra	600m	Warna Sari	West Sumatra (Bukittinggi)	Ripan	-	Geri	-	IDR 10,000,000
Class E First Timer	600m	Blyze Triple Bee	Riau	Antoni	Agusril	Ayu Estu Kurnia	Triple Bee Stable	IDR 15,000,000
2yo Maiden C/D	600m	Putra Sikumbang	West Sumatra (Pariaman)	Pamudia Agusta	Riki Ade Saputra	Ajo Fildan	Ajo Stable	IDR 20,000,000
3yo Maiden A/B	800m	Markoni	West Sumatra (Payakumbuh)	Zul Henri	Agusril	Sasril, SE	Serumpun Stable	IDR 20,000,000
Open Class E	1200m	King Oil dh. Rajo Bintang	DI Yogyakarta	Nur Syafri	Anto GL	Mika Setia Wati	PT. KSN Stable	IDR 20,000,000
3yo Juvenile Prospects Div. II	1200m	Black Dynamite	West Sumatra (Padang)	Hermansyah	Arif Arianto	Nanda .P	Dynamite Stable	IDR 45,000,000
3yo Juvenile Prospects Div. I	1200m	Saga Serumpun	West Sumatra (Payakumbuh)	Hermansyah	Riki Ade Saputra	Sasril, SE	Serumpun Group	IDR 70,000,000
3yo Derby Prospects Div. II	1400m	Raja Bhayangkara	Central Java	Tripan Eri	Syafrinal	Kombes Imam Riyadi	Winoto Stable	IDR 65,000,000
3yo Derby Prospects Div. I	1400m	Milea Guti	West Sumatra (Bukittinggi)	Tripan Eri	Syafrinal	Wahyu Kurniawan	Guti Stable Bukittinggi	IDR 85,000,000
4y Class A/B	1600m	Romantic Spartan	West Sumatra (Padang Panjang)	Rudy Rahmat	Tuan Amiris	Muhammad Ikhsan	San Marino Stable	IDR 45,000,000

Chariot Racing

Race		Winner				Purse
Classification	Distance	Horse	Contingent	Jockey	Owner	Purse
Draf Bogie Baru (New Chariots)	2400m	Kharanggo Chaniago	West Sumatra (Bukittinggi)	Jangguik	Akirudin	IDR 10,000,000
Draf Bogie Usang Baru (Used New Chariots)	3200m	Salimado Merah	West Sumatra (Bukittinggi)	Cam Sutan Mantari	Edo	IDR 10,000,000
Draf Bogie Usang Lamo (Old Used Chariots)	3200m	Merah Tando	West Sumatra (Bukittinggi)	Man	Soni	IDR 10,000,000

=== 59th Kejurnas PORDASI Seri II 2025 ===
Venue: Sultan Agung Racecourse

Race		Winner						Purse
Classification	Distance	Horse	Contingent	Jockey	Trainer	Owner	Stable	Purse
Non Kejurnas
2y Maiden	800m	Paco Eclipse	Central Java	Meikel Soleran	Rulli Soleran	Imelda Margaretha Hartono	Eclipse Stable	IDR 15,000,000
Class G	1000m	Bless Virginia	South Kalimantan	Riski Rorimpandey	Marcel Ratu	Sheila Putri Mahardika	BHM Stable	IDR 10,000,000
3yo Maiden	1200m	Lady Arion	West Java	Hanny Suoth	Karlan	Kusnadi Halim	King Halim Stable	IDR 15,000,000
3yo Juvenile Div. II	1200m	Golden Glory	Bali	Yanni Rondowunu	Yori Lampus	Awiki	Naviri Stable	IDR 20,000,000
3yo Juvenile Div. I	1200m	Kana Eclipse	Central Java	Meikel Soleran	Rulli Soleran	Ir. Iman Hartono	Eclipse Stable	IDR 30,000,000
3yo Derby Div. II	1400m	Elya Savona	East Java	Yonathan Langi	Ndenna Ngaba	Atan Jannatan	Jatinom Indah Stable	IDR 30,000,000
3yo Derby Div. I	1400m	Mayo	North Sulawesi	Jones Paendong	Steven Paendong	Andrea N. Supit	Miranda Stable	IDR 40,000,000
3yo+ Indonesian Thoroughbreds	1400m	Cronos Eclipse	Central Java	Hesky Paendong	Rulli Soleran	Imelda Margaretha Hartono	Eclipse Stable	IDR 20,000,000
Kejurnas
Class F	1000m	Kasmaran	DK Jakarta	Agung Saidil	Ardhi Wijaya	Windika	Adem Ayem Stable	IDR 20,000,000
Class D Sprint	1000m	Ravelio	DK Jakarta	Ended Rahmad	Heri Rukmana	M. Topan Firmansyah	Ratu Kereta Stable	IDR 30,000,000
Class C Sprint	1100m	Dragon	East Java	Rizki Nugraha	Nhoni Ratu	Saiful & Lukman	Bintang Madura Stable	IDR 40,000,000
Class E	1200m	P. Super Montong	South Kalimantan	Salman Farid	Ardhi Wijaya	Mahardika	BHM Stable	IDR 20,000,000
Class B Sprint	1200m	Bintang Maja	DK Jakarta	Ended Rahmad	M. Dani	H. Obeng Sobari	Jalu Stable	IDR 50,000,000
Class D	1400m	Santana Rembulan	Central Java	Trully Pantow	Lili Momuat	Alana Senja	Bintang Stable	IDR 30,000,000
Class C	1600m	Flamboyan	East Java	Angel Manarisip	Nicky Pantow	Drs. H. Sentot DJ	Nona Cindy Stable	IDR 40,000,000
Class B	1850m	War Kudeta	West Java	Hanny Suoth	Karlan	Kusnadi Halim	King Halim Stable	IDR 50,000,000
**Class A Sprint (Super Sprint)**	1300m	Princess Gavi	West Java	Hanny Suoth	Karlan	Kusnadi Halim	King Halim Stable	IDR 70,000,000
**Class A (Star of Stars)**	2200m	Naga Sembilan	DK Jakarta	Achmad Saefudin	Bagus Haryanto	Ny. Raihana Bagus	Red Stone Stable	IDR 70,000,000

==== President of the Republic of Indonesia Cup ====
The President of the Republic of Indonesia Cup (Piala Presiden RI) is given to the provincial contingent with the most points across Kejurnas Seri I and Kejurnas Seri II. DK Jakarta are victorious with 0.25 points over West Java.

Final Standings
Rank	Contingent	Points		Grand Total
Rank	Contingent	Kejurnas I	Kejurnas II	Grand Total
1	DK Jakarta	33	52.5	85.5
2	West Java	50	35.25	85.25
3	Central Java	41	23	64
4	East Java	8	38	46
5	North Sulawesi	23.5	1.25	24.75
6	South Kalimantan	0	18	18
7	West Sumatra	15.5	0	15.5
8	East Kalimantan	9	0	9

=== King Hamengku Buwono X Cup 2025 ===
Venue: Sultan Agung Racecourse

Race		Winner						Purse
Classification	Distance	Horse	Contingent	Jockey	Trainer	Owner	Stable	Purse
Class I/J	1000m	Power Rangers	East Java	Zainul Fanani	Firmansyah Candra	H. Nurul Huda	Cahaya Mulya Stable	IDR 10,000,000
Class H	1000m	Falling In Love	DK Jakarta	Agung Saidil Adha	Ardhi Wijaya	Suwandi	Maju Jaya Stable	IDR 10,000,000
Glass G	1000m	P. Bless Virginia	South Kalimantan	Marcel Ratu	Raymond Tambaani	Sheila Putri Mahardika	BHM Stable	IDR 10,000,000
Class F	1000m	Kasmaran	DK Jakarta	Agung Saidil Adha	Ardhi Wijaya	Roy Irawan Djatmiko	Djon's Stable	IDR 30,000,000
2yo Maiden A/B	1000m	Remo Eclipse	Central Java	Hesky Paendong	Venty Pantow	Imelda Margaretha Hartono	Eclipse Stable	IDR 40,000,000
Class D Sprint	1000m	Harata Eclipse	Central Java	Meikel Soleran	Venty Pantow	Ir. Iman Hartono	Eclipse Stable	IDR 40,000,000
Class C Sprint	1100m	Dragon	Jatim	Rizki Nugraha	Jhoni Ratu	Saiful & Lukman	Bintang Madura Stable	IDR 50,000,000
Class E	1200m	P. Super Montong	South Kalimantan	Salman Farid	Ardhi Wijaya	Sheila Putri Mahardika	BHM Stable	IDR 40,000,000
3yo Juvenile Div. II	1200m	Mandoge	East Kalimantan	Joshua Meikel Rori	Novi Telew	H. Indra Aridhawansyah	Wining Stable	IDR 50,000,000
3yo Juvenile Div. I	1200m	Kana Eclipse	Central Java	Meikel Soleran	Rulli Soleran	Ir. Iman Hartono	Eclipse Stable	IDR 80,000,000
Open Sprint	1300m	War Kudeta	West Java	Jemmy Runtu	Karlan	Kusnadi Halim	King Halim Stable	IDR 100,000,000
3yo Derby Div. II	1400m	Burrito Libre	East Java	Rizki Nugraha	Joni Ratu	Saipul & Lukman	Bintang Madura	IDR 60,000,000
Class D	1400m	Arceus Nagari	DK Jakarta	Achmad Saefudin	Wahyu Wicaksono	Aryo P.S Djojohadikusumo	Sarga Stable	IDR 50,000,000
3yo Derby Div. I	1400m	Monochrome	North Sulawesi	Jones Paendong	Steven Paendong	Nico Kanter	Miranda Stable	IDR 110,000,000
Class C	1600m	Flamboyan	East Java	Angel Manarisip	Nicky Pantow	Drs. H. Sentot DJ	Nona Cindy Stable	IDR 50,000,000
Indonesian Thoroughbreds	1600m	Sunglow Nagari	East Kalimantan	Joshua Meikel Rori	Novi Telew	H. Indra Aridhawansyah	Wining Stable	IDR 40,000,000
**Open (HBX Cup)**	2000m	Triple's	Central Java	Meikel Soleran	Slamet Pak Wo	H. Achmad Fitra	Shella Sayukia Stable	IDR 200,000,000
2yo Maiden C/D	2000m	Berkah Segoroyoso	DI Yogyakarta	Valentino Wongkar	Muh Rofi	Drs. H Hoebardiono, S.E.	Segoroyoso Stable	IDR 30,000,000

== Awards ==
=== Sarga Indonesia's Horse Racing Award 2025 ===
The Sarga Indonesia's Horse Racing Award 2025 was part of the Indonesia Rising Stars Award 2025, an event from SARGA.CO awarding various achievements across equine sports.

Winners and Nominees
Best Horse: 1 - King Argentin; 2 - Kasmaran; Naga Sembilan; Dragon; Harata Eclipse; Naura Ayu; Kana Eclipse; Triple's; Princess Gavi; Dominator	Best Jockey: 1 - Meikel Soleran; 2 - Angel Manarisip; 3 - Jemmy Runtu; Hesky Paendong; Agung Saidil; Hanny Suoth; Iqbal Rahmadias; Ended Rahmat; Yanni Rondowunu; Achmad Saefudin
Best Trainer: 1 - Rully Soleran; 2 - Karlan; 3 - Nicky Pantow; Ardhi Wijaya; Tenny Rori; Steven Paendong; Jendri Turangan; Lili Momuat; Rizal; Slamet Pak Wo	Best Stable: 1 - King Halim Stable; 2 - Eclipse Stable; 3 - Aragon Stable; Nona Cindy Stable; Amigo Stable; BHM Stable; Bintang Madura Stable; Djon's Stable; Miranda Stable; Tombo Ati Stable

== See also ==
- Horse Racing in Indonesia
- Indonesia Derby
- Indonesian Triple Crown
- Equestrian Association of Indonesia
- King Argentin
- Milord (horse)
