= Mayor of Blitar =

- Wali Kota Blitar
- Coat of arms of Blitar

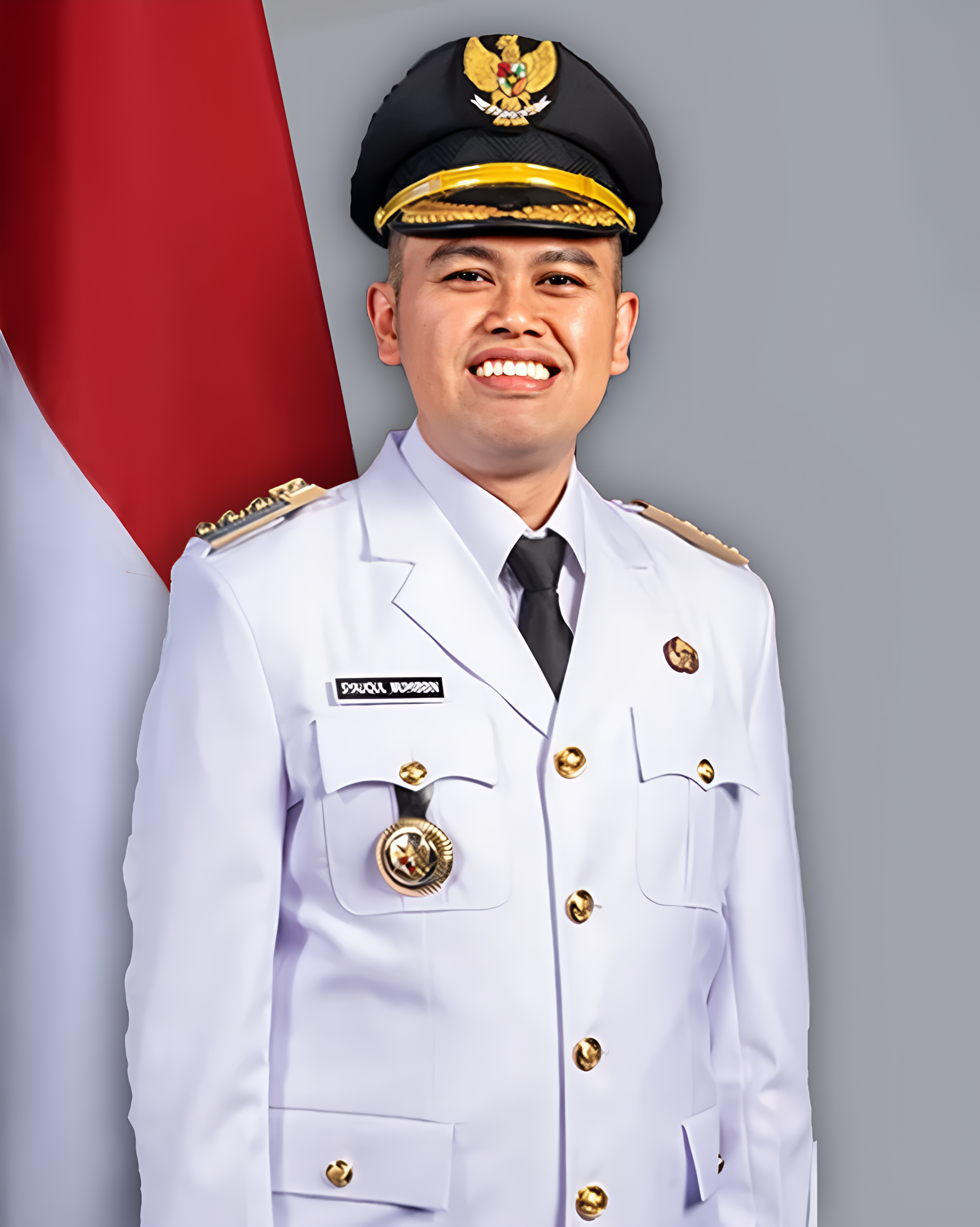
- Incumbent; Syauqul Muhibbin since 20 February 2025
- Term length: 5 years
- Inaugural holder: J.H. Boerstra
- Formation: 1906
- Website: www.blitarkota.go.id

Mayor of Blitar is the head of the second-level region who holds the government in Blitar together with the Vice Mayor and 25 members of the Blitar City Regional House of Representatives. The mayor and vice mayor of Blitar are elected through general elections held every 5 years. The first mayor of Blitar was J.H. Boerstra.

== List ==
The following is a list of the names of the Mayors of Blitar from time to time.

Dutch East Indies Period
Num.	Portrait	Mayor	Beginning of office	End of Term	Political Party / Faction	Period	Note.	Vice mayor
1		J.H. Boerstra			Independent	1	(Note: Assistant Resident of Kediri)	N/A
2		Th. J. Cathero			Independent	2		N/A
Japanese Occupation Period
Num.	Portrait	Mayor	Beginning of office	End of Term	Political Party / Faction	Period	Note.	Vice mayor
1		Dradjad Prawiro Soebroto	1942	1943	Independent	3	(Note: Shi-chō, designated by Japan.)	N/A
2		R. Soedradjad	1943	1944	Independent	4		N/A
3		R. Mochtar Praboe Mangkoenegoro	1944	1945	Independent	5		N/A
Mayor of Blitar
Num.	Portrait	Mayor	Beginning of office	End of Term	Political Party / Faction	Period	Note.	Vice mayor
1		Soeroso Harsono	1945	1947	Independent	6		N/A
2		R. Soenarjo Adiprodjo	1947	1948	Independent	7		N/A
3		Soenarjo (Temporary acting)	1948	1948	Independent	8		N/A
4		Soetadji	1949	1950	Independent	9		N/A
5		Soepardi	1950	1953	Independent	10		N/A
6		R. Ismaoen Danoe Soesastro	1953	1956	Independent	11		N/A
7		Soeparngadi	1956	1960	Independent	12		N/A
8		R. Koesmadi	1960	1964	Independent	13		N/A
9		R. M. Prawiro Koesoemo	1966	1968	Independent	14		N/A
10		Fakhihudin	1968	1968	Independent	15		N/A
11		Drs. Soejadi	1969	1975	Independent	16		N/A
12		Drs. Soekirman	1975	1985	Independent	17		N/A
13		Drs. Harjono Koesoemo	1985	1990	Independent	18		N/A
14		Drs. H. Achmad Boedi Soesetyo	1990	1995	Independent	19		N/A
15		H. Istijono Sunarto, S.H.	1995	3 May 2000	Independent	20		N/A
16		Drs. H. Djarot Saiful Hidayat, M.S.	3 May 2000	3 May 2005	PDI-P	21		Mohammad Zainuddin
16		Drs. H. Djarot Saiful Hidayat, M.S.	3 August 2005	3 August 2010	PDI-P	22 (2005)		Endro Hermono
17		Muhammad Samanhudi Anwar, S.H. M.M.	3 August 2010	3 August 2015	PDI-P	23 (2010)		Purnawan Buchori
–		Rudi Wijanarko (Daily executive)	4 August 2015	18 August 2015	Independent	–		N/A
–		Suprianto, S.H. M.H. (Acting)	19 August 2015	17 February 2016	Independent	–		N/A
(17)		Muhammad Samanhudi Anwar, S.H. M.M.	17 February 2016	15 February 2019	PDI-P	24 (2015)	(Note: Detained by the KPK since 9 June 2018 because he was named a suspect for alleged corruption in the procurement of goods and services in the Blitar City Government in the 2018 Fiscal Year.)	Santoso
18		Drs. H. Santoso, M.Pd. (Acting Officer)	15 February 2019	19 May 2020	PDI-P	24 (2015)		N/A
18		Drs. H. Santoso, M.Pd.	19 May 2020	26 September 2020	PDI-P	24 (2015)		N/A
–		Jumadi (Temporary Acting)	26 September 2020	5 December 2020	Independent	24 (2015)		N/A
(18)		Drs. H. Santoso, M.Pd.	5 December 2020	17 February 2021	PDI-P	24 (2015)		N/A
–		Hermansyah Permadi (Daily executive)	17 February 2021	26 February 2021	Independent	–		N/A
(18)		Drs. H. Santoso, M.Pd.	26 February 2021	20 February 2025	PDI-P	25 (2020)		Tjutjuk Sunario
19		H. Syauqul Muhibbin, S.HI.	20 February 2025	Incumbent	Independent	26 (2024)		Elim Tyu Samba

== See also ==
- Blitar
- List of incumbent regional heads and deputy regional heads in East Java
