= Falling In Love (horse) =

Indonesia-bred racehorse

- Breed: KP5 (Pordasi classification)
- Sire: Minahasa Eclipse
- Grandsire: Snitzel
- Dam: Sri Jaya
- Damsire: Raga Jaya
- Sex: Filly
- Foaled: December, 22, 2023
- Country: Indonesia
- Colour: Bay (Jragem)
- Breeder: Maju Jaya Stable
- Owner: Suwandi
- Trainer: Ardhi Wijaya
- Jockey: Agung Saidil Adha
- Record: 3: 3-0-0
- Earnings: Rp. 13.000.000

Major wins
- Piala Raja HB X – H Class 1000M (2025); BK Porprov Jabar – G/H Class 1000M (2025)

Falling In Love (formerly known as Ratu Sukma Wijaya, foaled December 22, 2023 in Indramayu, West Java) is an active Indonesian racehorse.

== Background ==
Falling In Love is a bay filly foaled on December 22 at Indramayu, West Java. She was sired by Minahasa Eclipse, a son of Snitzel through of Sri Jaya, a daughter of Raga Jaya. Through her sire she is a descendant of the Japanese racehorse Fuji Kiseki, who is her dam's damsire. Falling In Love is currently being trained by Ardhi Wijaya and ridden by Agung Saidil Adha.

Falling In Love had a full brother named Pangeran Merta Wijaya. However, he died at 15 months old due to colic.

== Racing career ==
=== 2025: two-year-old season ===
Falling In Love made her debut on 9 November 2025 at Sultan Agung Racecourse in Bantul, Special Region of Yogyakarta, competing in the 1.000M H Class. When the race started, she had a late start which left her far behind the other horses, then she continued to chase and managed to lead by 10 horse length leaving her opponent far behind.

=== Racing form ===
The data below are mostly based on information available on livestreams from the YouTube channel and website of Sarga. Co, the main company that organizes and manages professional horseracing in Indonesia.

Date	Racecourse	Race	Class	Distance	Entry	HN	Finished	Time	Jockey	Winner (2nd place)	Ref.
Nov 9, 2025	Sultan Agung	Piala Raja HB X	H	1000m	12	1	1st		Agung Saidil Adha	(Opera O)	
Nov 23, 2025	Legokjawa	BK Porprov Jabar Gubernur Cup	G/H	1000m	6	3	1st		Agung Saidil Adha	(Naga Maja)	
Feb 15, 2026	Tegalwaton	Jateng Derby	G	1000m	12	2	1st	1:07.54	Agung Saidil Adha	(Petrus dh. Dinamika Boy)	

== Pedigree ==
Pedigree of Falling In Love (IDN), bay filly, 2023
Sire Minahasa Eclipse (f. Wimbledon) (AUS)	Snitzel (AUS)	Redoute's Choice (AUS)	Danehil (USA)
Sire Minahasa Eclipse (f. Wimbledon) (AUS)	Snitzel (AUS)	Redoute's Choice (AUS)	Shantas Choice (AUS)
Sire Minahasa Eclipse (f. Wimbledon) (AUS)	Snitzel (AUS)	Snippet Lass (AUS)	Snippet's (AUS)
Sire Minahasa Eclipse (f. Wimbledon) (AUS)	Snitzel (AUS)	Snippet Lass (AUS)	Snow Finch (IRE)
Sire Minahasa Eclipse (f. Wimbledon) (AUS)	Ditaz (NZ)	Don Eduardo (NZ)	Zabeel (NZ)
Sire Minahasa Eclipse (f. Wimbledon) (AUS)	Ditaz (NZ)	Don Eduardo (NZ)	Diamond Lover (AUS)
Sire Minahasa Eclipse (f. Wimbledon) (AUS)	Ditaz (NZ)	Zembu (AUS)	Fuji Kiseki (JPN)
Sire Minahasa Eclipse (f. Wimbledon) (AUS)	Ditaz (NZ)	Zembu (AUS)	Wanice (USA)
Dam Sri Jaya (IDN)	Raga Jaya (IDN)	Touareq (IDN)	Sabeil (NZ)
Dam Sri Jaya (IDN)	Raga Jaya (IDN)	Touareq (IDN)	Star Sovereign (IDN)
Dam Sri Jaya (IDN)	Raga Jaya (IDN)	—	—
Dam Sri Jaya (IDN)	Raga Jaya (IDN)	—	—
Dam Sri Jaya (IDN)	Lilytee Trojan (IDN)	Burgh Health (AUS)	Bletchingly (AUS)
Dam Sri Jaya (IDN)	Lilytee Trojan (IDN)	Burgh Health (AUS)	Ninita (AUS)
Dam Sri Jaya (IDN)	Lilytee Trojan (IDN)	Riva (IDN)	Breeder's Fame (AUS)
Dam Sri Jaya (IDN)	Lilytee Trojan (IDN)	Riva (IDN)	Inggrit II (IDN)

== See also ==
- Horse racing in Indonesia
