= Mount Sago =

Mountain in Indonesia

Sago
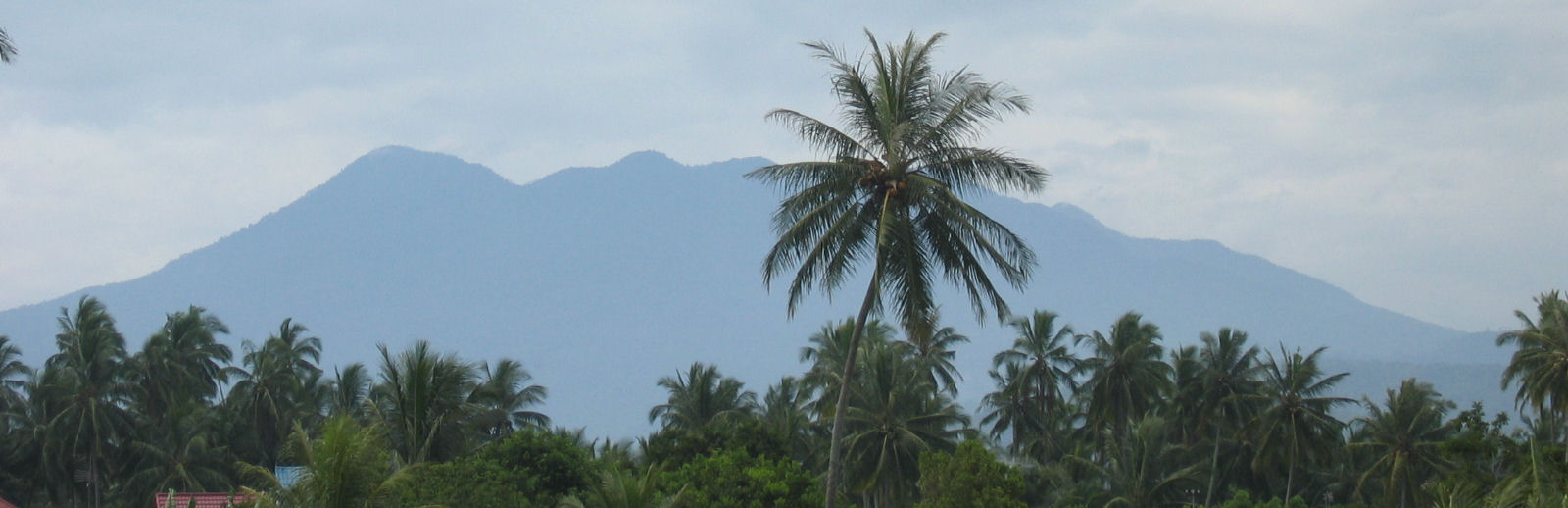

Highest point
- Elevation: 2,262 m (7,421 ft)
- Prominence: 1,379 m (4,524 ft)
- Listing: Ribu
- Coordinates: 0°19′37″S 100°40′14″E

Geography
- Location: West Sumatra, Indonesia
- Parent range: Barisan Mountains

Sago (also known as Malintang) is a mountain in West Sumatra, Indonesia. It is near the city of Payakumbuh and the town of Batusangkar. Mount Sago (Indonesian: Gunung Sago) is an imposing stratovolcano. It is one of the many mountains that form part of the Bukit Barisan Range, which runs along the western side of Sumatra island. With an elevation of approximately 2,261 meters (7,451 feet) above sea level, Mount Sago stands as a prominent feature in the region’s landscape.
