= Batuhampar =

Coordinates: 0°14′44.8″S 100°33′1.8″E

Batuhampar is a village in Lima Puluh Kota Regency near Payakumbuh City in West Sumatra, Indonesia.
