= Lord Montjeu =

Indonesian Thoroughbred racehorse

- Breed: Thoroughbred
- Sire: Hanoman YR
- Grandsire: Hanoman II
- Dam: Mauria
- Damsire: Montjeu
- Sex: Horse
- Foaled: September 7, 2019
- Country: Indonesia
- Colour: Gray
- Breeder: Tombo Ati Stable
- Owner: M. Ervan M. Ersan
- Trainer: Muchamad Rizal
- Jockey: Agus Setiono; Abdul Majid; Aldy Tumewu; Meikel Soleran; Stief Tongkeles

Major wins
- Jateng Derby (THB IDN, 2023); Kejurnas Series II (3YO THB IDN, 2024); Triple Crown Series I (3YO+ THB, 2025); Kejurnas Series I (3YO+ THB IDN, 2025)

Lord Montjeu (foaled September 7, 2019) is an Indonesian Thoroughbred racehorse. He is known for winning several national Thoroughbred races in 2024 to 2025, including in the Kejurnas series.

== Background ==
Lord Montjeu is a gray horse foaled on September 7, 2019 at Tombo Ati Stable in Semarang Regency, Central Java. His sire is Hanoman YR, a son of Hanoman II, and his dam is Mauria, a daughter of Montjeu. Lord Montjeu inherits the blood of Montjeu, an Irish horse who won 6 Group 1 races.

He has a sibling from the same broodmare, Star Montjeu, who also races in the Indonesian Thoroughbred class. They sometimes face each other in the same races.

Lord Montjeu's owner is M. Ervan M. Ersan, and was trained by Muchamad Rizal. He often ridden by Agus Setiono, Aldy Tumewu, and Meikel Soleran.

== Racing career ==
Between 2024 and 2025, he secured three major victories in the Indonesian Thoroughbred class, including the 2024 Kejurnas Series II, the 2025 Triple Crown Series I, and the 2025 Kejurnas Series I.

In addition to his victories, this horse was also known as a formidable competitor, almost always finishing on the podium, with three runner-up finishes. Throughout his career, Lord Montjeu engaged in a fierce rivalry with She's Coming, with the two frequently taking turns occupying the first position.

Lord Montjeu represents the province of Central Java.

=== Racing form ===
Date	Racecourse	Event	Race	Distance	Entry	HN	Finished	Time	Jockey	Winner (Runner-up)	Ref.
2022 – two-year-old season
Jul 30, 2022	Legokjawa	Susi Air Cup	2yo THB IDN	1400m	3	1	2nd		A. Setiono	Mahkota Sion	
2023 – three-year-old season
Feb 26, 2023	Tegalwaton	A.E. Kawilarang Memorial Cup	3yo+ THB IDN	1600m	3	2	2nd		A. Setiono	She's Coming	
May 6, 2023	Legokjawa	Bupati Pangandaran Cup	THB IDN	1600m	4		3rd		A. Setiono	Mahkota Sion	
Jun 3, 2023	Legokjawa	AF Soma Memorial Cup	3yo+ THB IDN	1600m	4		2nd		A. Setiono	She's Coming	
2023 – four-year-old season
Aug 8, 2023	Tegalwaton	Porprov Jateng XVl	THB IDN	2000m	4	2	3rd		A. Tumewu	Mahkota Sion	
Jan 14, 2024	Tegalwaton	Jateng Derby	THB IDN	1600m	4	1	1st		A. Setiono	(She's Coming)	
Nov 17, 2024	Tegalwaton	Kejurnas Series II	3yo+ THB IDN	1600m	3	2	1st	1:50.54	A. Majid	(She's Coming)	
May 21, 2025	Sultan Agung	Triple Crown Series I	3yo+ THB	1600m	4	1	1st	1:54.62	A. Tumewu	(Vaux Theater)	
May 16, 2025	Tegalwaton	Triple Crown Series II	THB IDN	1200m	4	1	2nd		A. Tumewu	Star Montjeu	
Jun 15, 2025	Sultan Agung	Indonesia's Horse Racing Cup I	THB IDN	1200m	4	2	2nd		A. Tumewu	She's Coming	
Jul 27, 2025	Sultan Agung	Kejurnas Series I	3yo+ THB IDN	1600m	4	1	1st		M. Soleran	(She's Coming)	
Aug 24, 2025	Legokjawa	Merdeka Cup	THB IDN	1600m	4	2	2nd		M. Soleran	She's Coming	
Nov 9, 2025	Sultan Agung	Piala Raja Hamengku Buwono X	THB IDN	1600m	4	1	4th		S. Tongkeles	Sunglow Nagari	

== Pedigree ==
Pedigree of Lord Montjeu (IDN), gray horse, 2019
Sire Hanoman Yr (IDN)	Hanoman (AUS)	Toy Pindarri (NZ)	Brigand (USA)
Sire Hanoman Yr (IDN)	Hanoman (AUS)	Toy Pindarri (NZ)	Small Edition (NZ)
Sire Hanoman Yr (IDN)	Hanoman (AUS)	Amarelle (AUS)	Marazion (GB)
Sire Hanoman Yr (IDN)	Hanoman (AUS)	Amarelle (AUS)	Carmella (AUS)
Sire Hanoman Yr (IDN)	No Brakes (AUS)	Northern Chateau (USA)	Northern Dancer (CAN)
Sire Hanoman Yr (IDN)	No Brakes (AUS)	Northern Chateau (USA)	Fair Arabella (USA)
Sire Hanoman Yr (IDN)	No Brakes (AUS)	Better Road (AUS)	Whiskey Road (USA)
Sire Hanoman Yr (IDN)	No Brakes (AUS)	Better Road (AUS)	Lynn's Charm (AUS)
Dam Mauria (NZ)	Montjeu (IRE)	Sadler's Wells (USA)	Northern Dancer (CAN)
Dam Mauria (NZ)	Montjeu (IRE)	Sadler's Wells (USA)	Fairy Bridge (USA)
Dam Mauria (NZ)	Montjeu (IRE)	Floripedes (FR)	Top Ville (IRE)
Dam Mauria (NZ)	Montjeu (IRE)	Floripedes (FR)	Toute Cy (FR)
Dam Mauria (NZ)	Miss Max (NZ)	Volksraad (GB)	Green Desert (USA)
Dam Mauria (NZ)	Miss Max (NZ)	Volksraad (GB)	Celtic Assembly (USA)
Dam Mauria (NZ)	Miss Max (NZ)	Satin Blush (NZ)	Tawfiq (USA)
Dam Mauria (NZ)	Miss Max (NZ)	Satin Blush (NZ)	Top Satin (NZ)
