= Samanhudi Anwar =

Indonesian politician

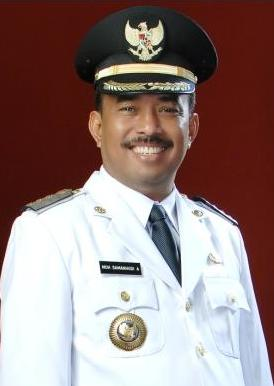

Mayor of Blitar
- In office 17 February 2016 – 15 February 2019
- President: Joko Widodo
- Governor: Soekarwo
- Preceded by: Suprianto (acting)
- Succeeded by: Santoso
- In office 3 August 2010 – 3 August 2015
- President: Susilo Bambang Yudhoyono; Joko Widodo
- Governor: Soekarwo
- Lieutenant: Purnawan Buchori
- Preceded by: Djarot Saiful Hidayat
- Succeeded by: Suprianto (pj.)

Chairman of the Regional People's Representative Assembly Blitar City
- In office 2009–2010
- Preceded by: Himself
- Succeeded by: Glebot Catur Arijanto
- In office 2004–2009
- Preceded by: Islan Gatot Imbata
- Succeeded by: Himself

Personal details
- Born: October 8, 1957 (age 68) Blitar, East Java, Indonesia
- Party: PDIP
- Spouse(s): Yuli Ratnasari (div. 2016) Echa Paramitha (m. 2017)
- Children: 5
- Education: Universitas Panca Bhakti University
- Profession: Politician

Muhamad Samanhudi Anwar (born 8 October 1957) is an Indonesian politician who served as Mayor of Blitar between 17 February 2016 and 15 February 2019. Previously he served as mayor of Blitar for the 2010–2015 period, Chairman of the Regional People's Representative Assembly of the Blitar City (2004–2010), and member of Regional People's Representative Assembly of the Blitar City (1999–2010).

== Background ==
The Samanhudi family comes from Alas Raje Village, Blega, Bangkalan Regency. He is known as a Nahdlatul Ulama figure like his parents who had been the Chair of the NU Tanfidziyah. His mother's name is Umi Maryam. In addition, he was a student at the Kedungdung Islamic Boarding School, Modung, Bangkalan.

== Mayor of Blitar ==
=== Local elections ===
In the 2010 Blitar City local elections, from a quick count conducted by the Clean Pilkada Concern Forum, Samanhudi garnered 16,060 votes. Coordinator of the Clean Local Elections Care Forum (FPPB) Sugeng Subianto said the calculation was based on 400 volunteers spread across three sub-districts of Blitar City. Samanhudi, who is paired with Purnawan Buchori, was declared superior in 21 sub-districts spread across Blitar City.

This pair defeated four other pairs Anang Triono–Bambang Gunawan (Golkar, Ulema National Awakening Party, and People's Conscience Party) who earned 11,181 votes. And the pair Heru Sunaryanta-Sholih Mu'adi only got 8,586 votes. Hendro Ermono-Azhar Anwar (United Development Party (PPP) and Prosperous Justice Party (PKS)) only got 4,509 votes. While the last position was occupied by the Zaenudin - Masrukin pair from the independent path with 1,193 votes.

=== Achievements ===
In 2014 the government of Blitar City was awarded the City with the best financial reports. The award certificate was handed over directly by Vice President Boediono to Mayor Samanhudi Anwar at the Danapala Building, Ministry of Finance, Jakarta. This appreciation is given annually to Regencies/Cities that have succeeded in obtaining an unqualified opinion (WTP) for the presentation and preparation of financial reports from the Supreme Audit Agency (BPK).

In addition, Blitar City won the 2013 Urban Management Innovation Award (IMP) from the Indonesian Ministry of Home Affairs for the Sanitation Sector of Wastewater. The City of Blitar and City of Payakumbuh together with the City of Banjarmasin, Denpasar, Surakarta, and Jambi became the cities of ISSDP Phase I (2006-2007). This program focuses on comprehensive sanitation development planning.

Samanhudi Anwar said that this success was an achievement for the people of Blitar City who had worked together to manage sanitation, where the community was able to manage waste properly without causing environmental pollution. "We are grateful and thank the residents of Blitar City for showing healthy behavior and being able to take good care of the environment, so that Blitar City won the 2013 IMP Award," said Samanhudi. Even though he has made achievements, he still asks the community to always and continue to protect the environment, especially regarding sanitation issues which have been a problem in society so far. However, currently there is a lot of assistance and work programs for the City of Blitar to maintain and manage wastewater through Wastewater Treatment Plants (WWTP) which have been built in several densely populated locations in three sub-districts in Blitar City, namely Sukorejo District, Kepanjenkidul District, and Sananwetan District. "With integrated program planning from the Blitar City Government, we invite the community to commit to realizing environment-based development to maintain these achievements," he said.

=== Trapped in corruption ===
On June 8, 2018, the Corruption Eradication Commission (KPK) named Samanhudi as a suspect in a suspected corruption case, namely accepting bribes related to the permit for a first high school construction project in Blitar. This determination stems from the KPK's hand-catching operation in Blitar two days earlier. After being declared a fugitive, Samanhudi finally surrendered to the Corruption Eradication Commission office on the evening of June 8. The following day, after being questioned for 6 hours, Samanhudi was immediately detained at the Central Jakarta Polrestro Detention Center by the Corruption Eradication Commission. Samanhudi was sentenced to five years in prison on January 24, 2019.

== Robbery suspects ==
Freed from prison in October 2022, Samanhudi was then arrested by the East Java Regional Police on January 27, 2023 for allegedly orchestrating the robbery of the Blitar Mayor's official residence on December 12, 2022. He admitted that he wanted to take political revenge on his former deputy who later replaced him as Mayor, Santoso.
