= Blitar City Regional House of Representatives =

Blitar City Regional House of Representatives Dewan Perwakilan Rakyat Daerah Kota Blitar
- 2024–2029 period
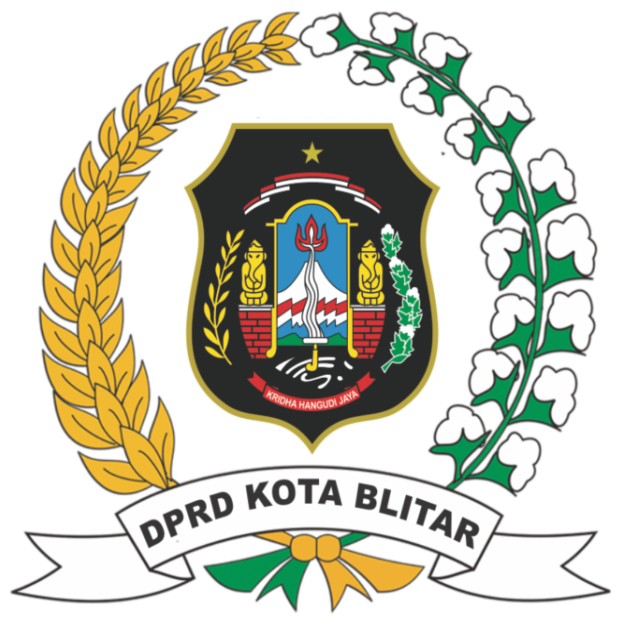

Type
- Type: Unicameral

History
- Founded: 1950
- New session started: 23 August 2024

Leadership
- Speaker: Syahrul Alim, PDI-P since 10 October 2024
- Deputy Speaker: Adi Santoso, PKB since 10 October 2024
- Deputy Speaker: Mohamad Hardita Magdi, Golkar since 10 October 2024

Structure
- Seats: 25
- Political groups: Government (9): PKB (5); PAN (3); Democratic (1); Opposition (16): PDI-P (8); Golkar (3); PPP (3); Gerindra (2)
- Length of term: 5 years

Elections
- Voting system: Open list proportional representation
- Last election: 14 February 2024

Meeting place
- Blitar City Regional House of Representatives Building; Ahmad Yani Street Number 19; Kepanjenlor, Kepanjenkidul, Blitar; East Java, Indonesia

Website
- dprd.blitarkota.go.id

The Blitar City Regional House of Representatives (Indonesian: Dewan Perwakilan Rakyat Daerah Kota Blitar, DPRD Kota Blitar) is the unicameral municipal legislature of Blitar, East Java, Indonesia. It has 25 members, who are elected every five years, simultaneously with the national legislative election.

== Legal basis ==
The legislature for Blitar was formed along with those of other cities in East Java under Law Number 17 of 1950, which organized city governments within the province.

== General election results ==
=== 2024 Indonesian legislative election ===
The official valid votes received by political parties contesting the 2024 Indonesian legislative election in each electoral district (constituency) for members of the Blitar City Regional House of Representatives are as follows.

2024 Indonesian legislative election results

Electoral district	PKB	Gerindra	PDI-P	Golkar	NasDem	Labour	Gelora	PKS	PKN	Hanura	Garuda	PAN	PBB	Democratic	PSI	Perindo	PPP	Ummat	Valid votes
Blitar City 1	4,305	887	11,889	2,201	330	0	757	1,846	16	14	11	2,047	15	176	268	27	3,173	33	27,995
Blitar City 2	6,190	2,932	8,403	4,629	1,494	0	142	1,909	68	1,660	847	2,405	9	2,018	246	228	2,517	41	35,738
Blitar City 3	5,163	4,493	9,475	3,406	123	0	60	1,101	1,018	5	12	4,632	10	119	228	34	3,796	29	33,704
Total	15,658	8,312	29,767	10,236	1,947	0	959	4,856	1,102	1,679	870	9,084	34	2,313	742	289	9,486	103	97,437
Source: General Elections Commission of Indonesia

== Composition ==
The following is the composition of members of the Blitar City Regional House of Representatives in the last four periods.

Party	Total seats			
Party	2009–2014	2014–2019	2019–2024	2024–2029
PKB seats	3	3	▲4	▲5
Gerindra seats	0	▲3	▼2	2
PDI-P seats	6	▲10	10	▼8
Golkar seats	3	▼1	▲2	▲3
NasDem seats		1	▼0	0
PKS seats	1	1	1	▼0
Hanura seats	2	▼1	1	▼0
PAN seats	0	0	0	▲3
Demokrat seats	6	▼2	2	▼1
PPP seats	3	3	3	3
PKNU seats	1			
Total Seats	25	25	25	25
Total Party	8	▲9	▼8	▼7

== Electoral District ==
In the 2019 Legislative Election and the 2024 Legislative Election, the Blitar City Regional House of Representatives election was divided into 3 electoral districts as follows:

Electoral District Name	Electoral District Area	Number of Seats
BLITAR CITY 1	Kepanjenkidul	7
BLITAR CITY 2	Sananwetan	9
BLITAR CITY 3	Sukorejo	9
TOTAL		25

== See also ==
- East Java Regional House of Representatives
- Blitar
- East Java
