= Payakumbuh =

City in West Sumatra, Indonesia

Payakumbuh Payokumbuah (Minangkabau)
- City
- City of Payakumbuh; Kota Payakumbuh

Other transcription(s)
  - Jawi: ڤايوكومبواه
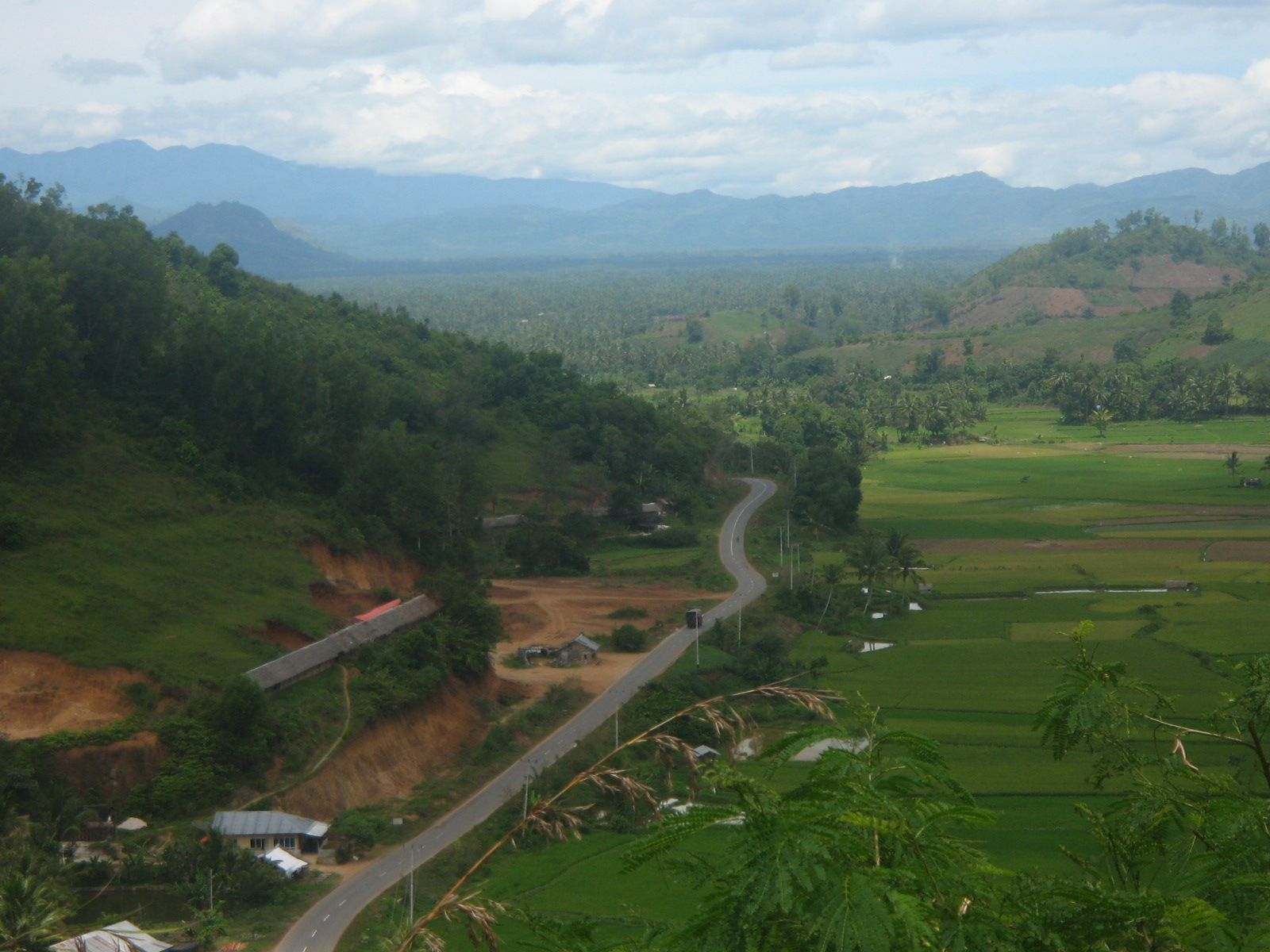
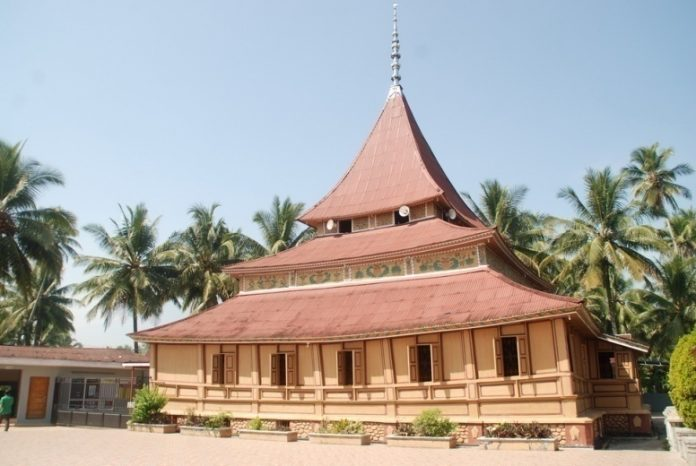
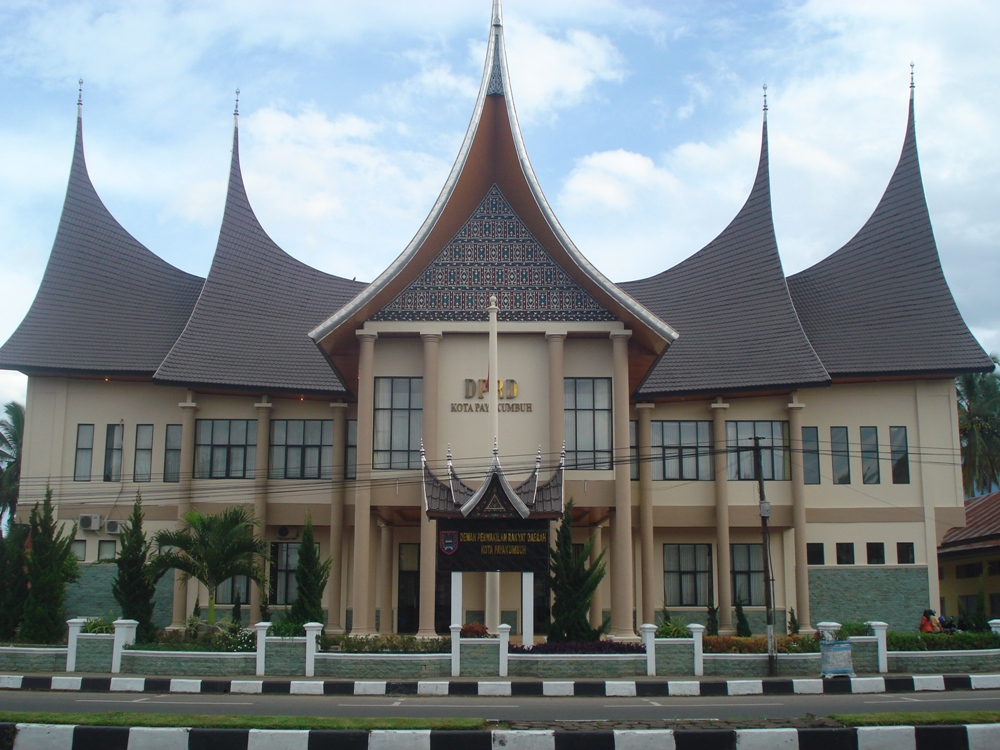
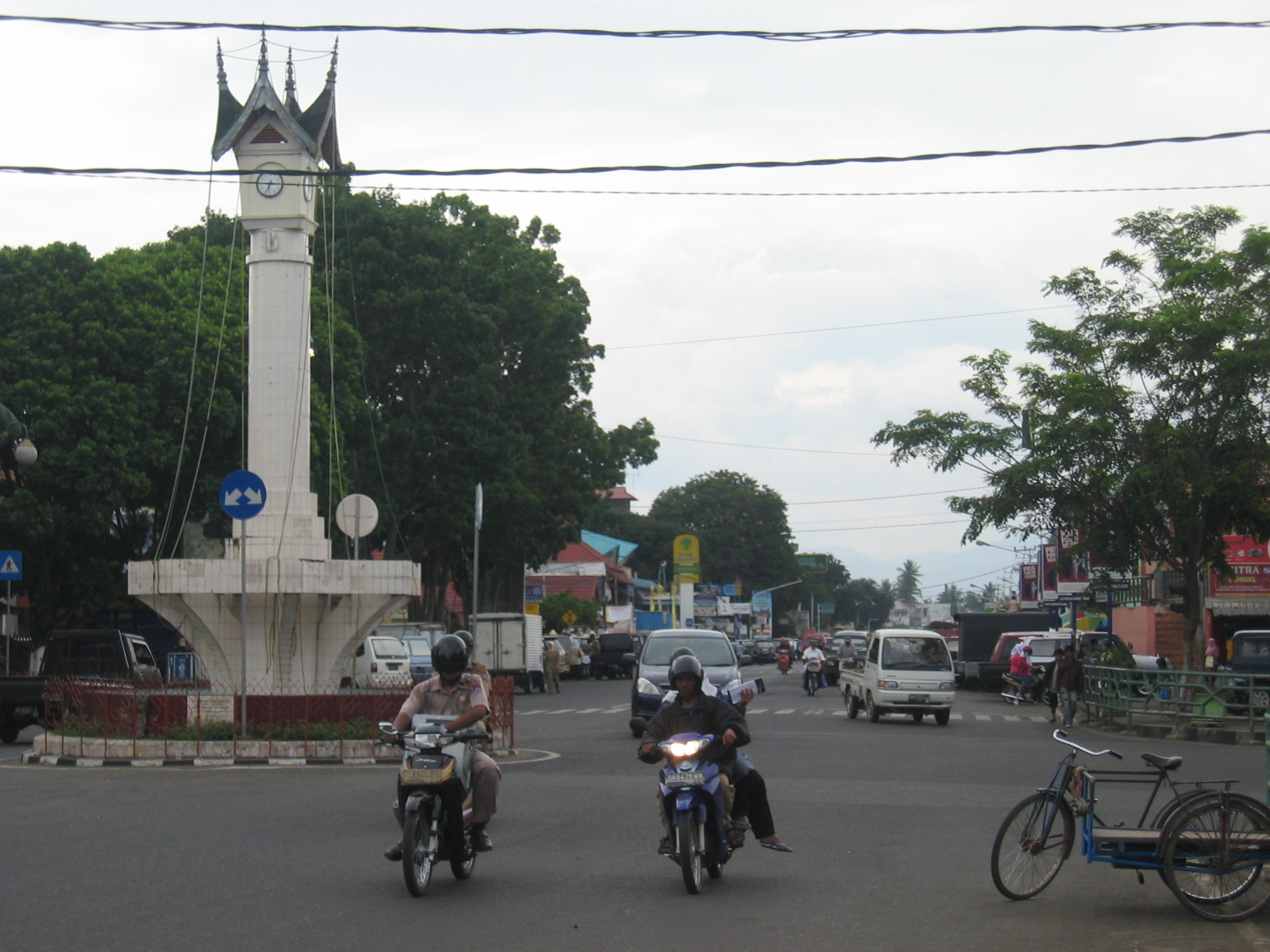
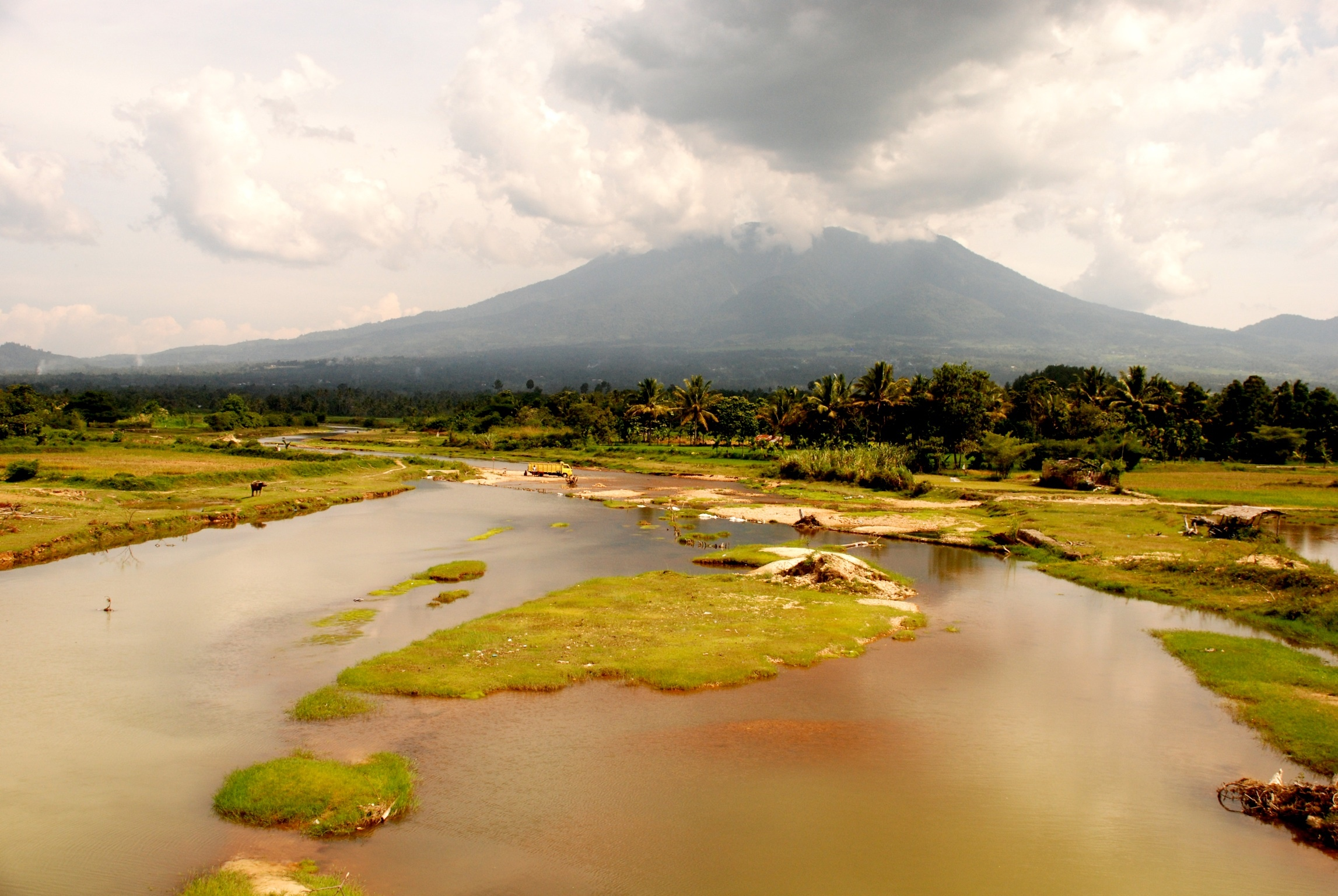
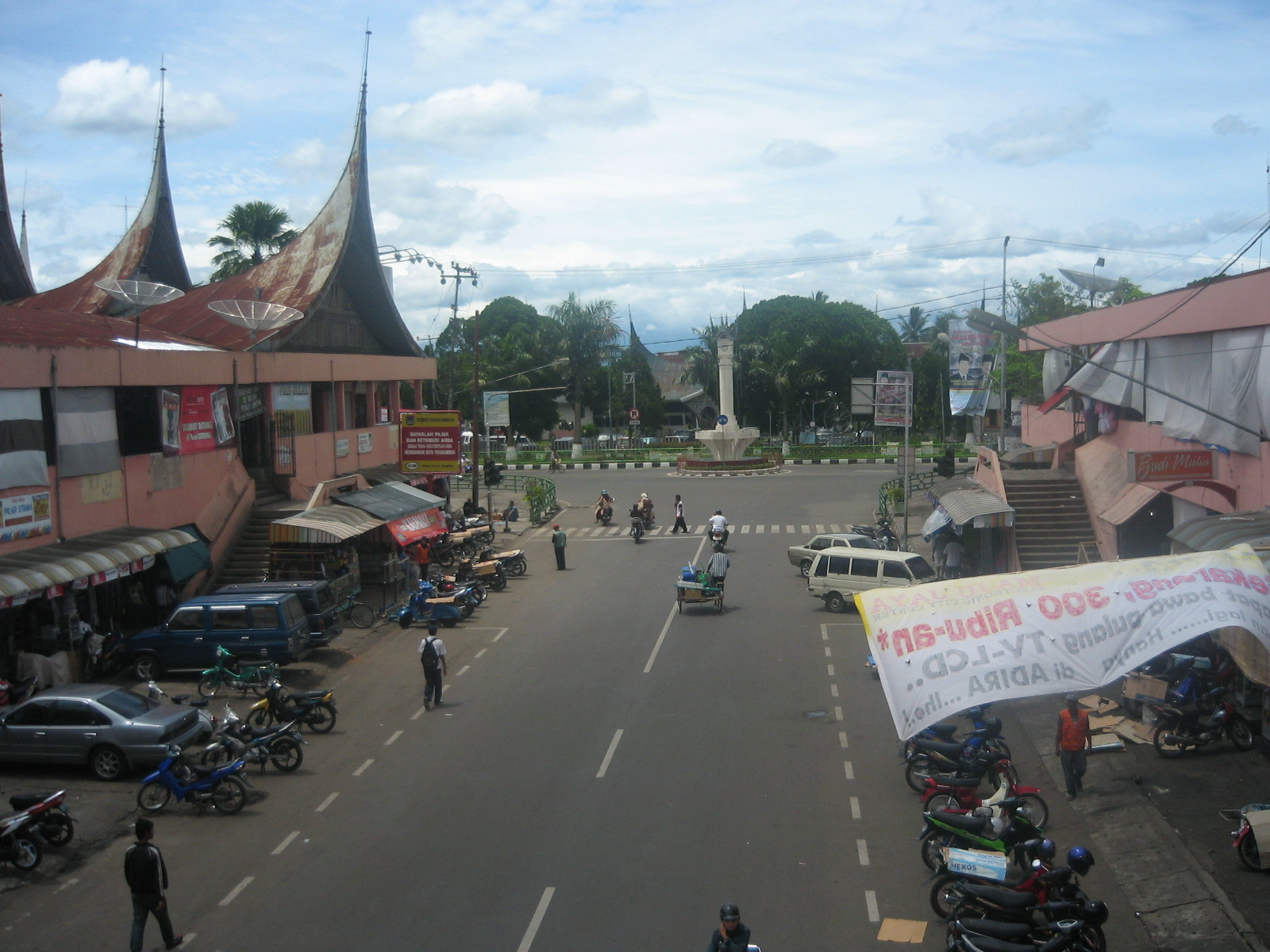
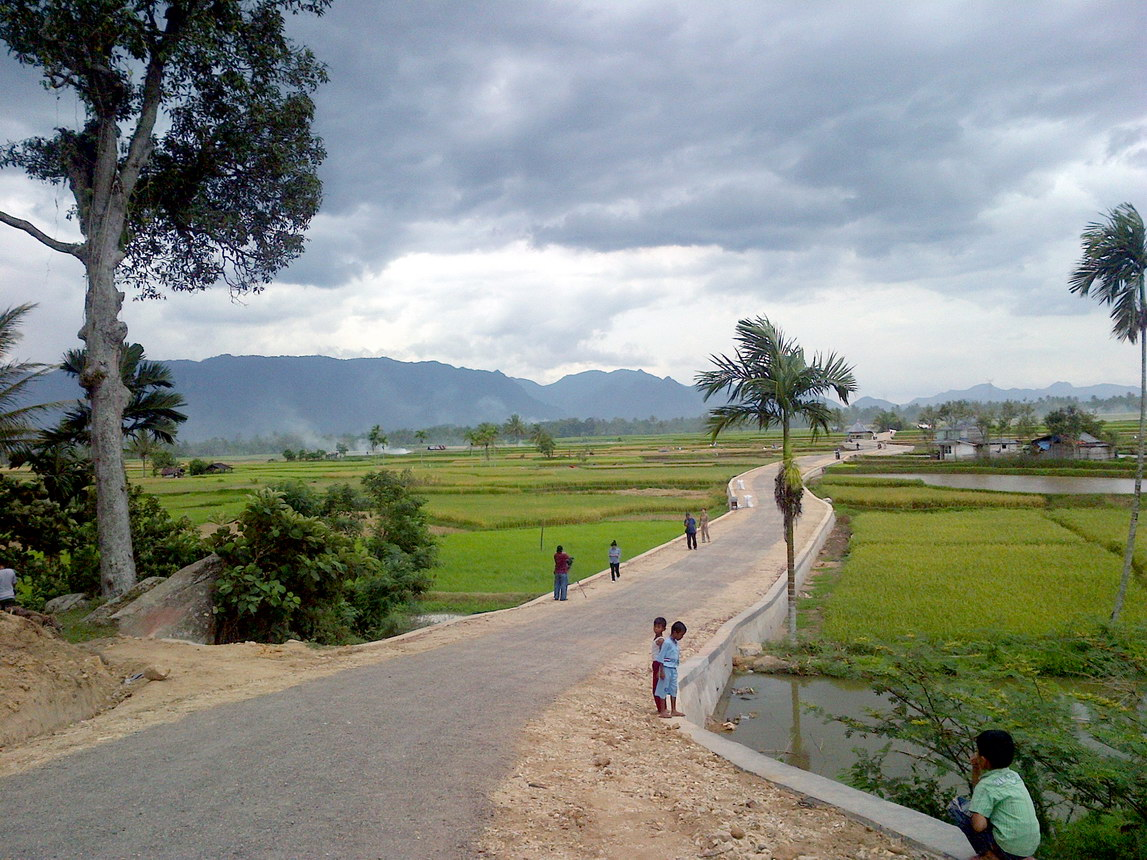
- From above, left to rightː Ngalau Indah, Tuo Koto Nan Ampek Mosque, Payakumbuh City Council Office, Monument on Jalan Soekarno-Hatta which is now Adipura monument, Mount Sago, Adipura monument Road Junction, and rice fields.

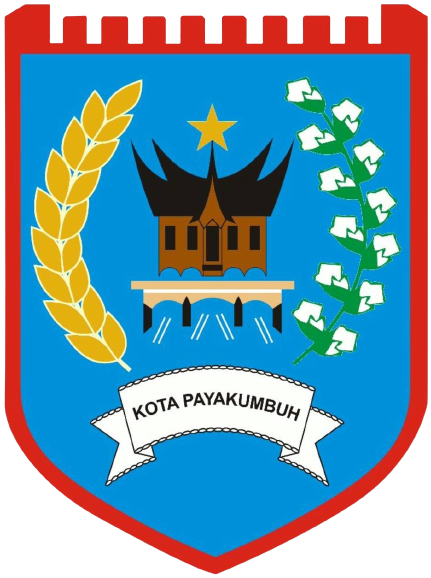
- Coat of arms

- Location within West Sumatra

- Location in West Sumatra and Indonesia Payakumbuh (Indonesia)
- Coordinates: 0°14′S 100°38′E
- Country: Indonesia
- Province: West Sumatra
- Established: March 19, 1956

Government
  - Mayor: Zulmaeta
  - Vice Mayor: Elzadaswarman

Area
  - Total: 80.43 km^{2} (31.05 sq mi)

Population (mid 2025 estimate)
  - Total: 148,600
  - Density: 1,848/km^{2} (4,785/sq mi)
- Time zone: UTC+7 (Indonesia Western Time)
- Area code: (+62) 752
- Climate: Af
- Website: payakumbuhkota.go.id

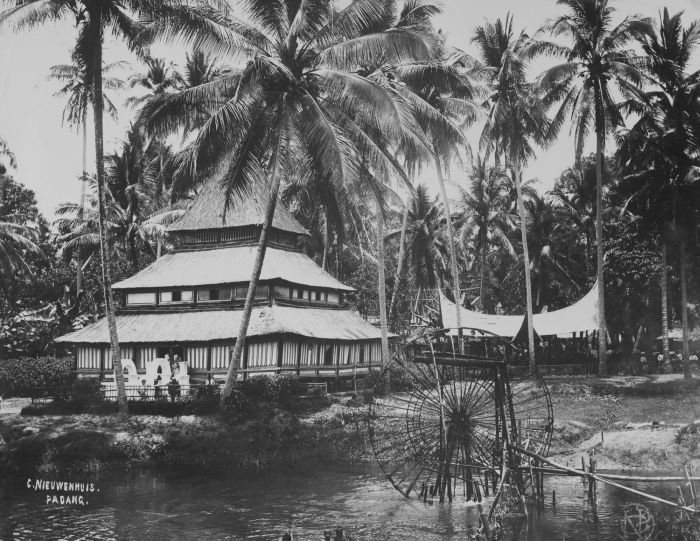
Pajakoemboeh scene with water wheel, children swimming, a mosque and a Minangkabau town hall in the background

Payakumbuh (Minangkabau: Payokumbuah, Jawi: ڤايوكومبواه) is the second largest city in West Sumatra province, Indonesia, with a population of 116,825 at the 2010 Census and 139,576 at the 2020 Census; the official estimate as of mid 2025 was 148,600 (comprising 74,660 males and 73,940 females). It covers an area of 80.43 km^{2} and is in the Minangkabau Highlands, 120 km by road from the West Sumatran capital city of Padang and 180 km from the Riau capital city of Pekanbaru.

The whole area is surrounded on all sides by (but administratively independent from) the Lima Puluh Kota Regency, making it an enclave. It is located near the volcanoes of Mount Merapi, Mount Sago, and Bukit Barisan. Payakumbuh means "grassy swamp" in the Minangkabau language, suggesting that the area was originally swampy.

In 2011, Payakumbuh had the highest economic growth of any city in West Sumatra. Innovations in sanitation, waste management, healthy traditional markets, street vendors coaching, and urban drainage resulted in this city being awarded the "Urban Innovation Management" in 2012. In 2013, Payakumbuh received the "Adipura" ('cleanest city') award in the category of small city for the seventh time.

Payakumbuh is known for flying duck races, foods like batiah (small sweet rice cookies), gelamai (a sweet coconut palm sugared snack) and rendang. Payakumbuh produces a wide range of agriculture products including rice, milk, cattle and palm sugar.

Payakumbuh and its surrounding villages within Lima Puluh Kota Regency, namely Mungka (in Mungka District), Simalanggang (in Payakumbuh District) and Batuhampar (in Akabiluru District) are the origin of the Negeri Sembilan people of Malaysia.

== Transportation ==
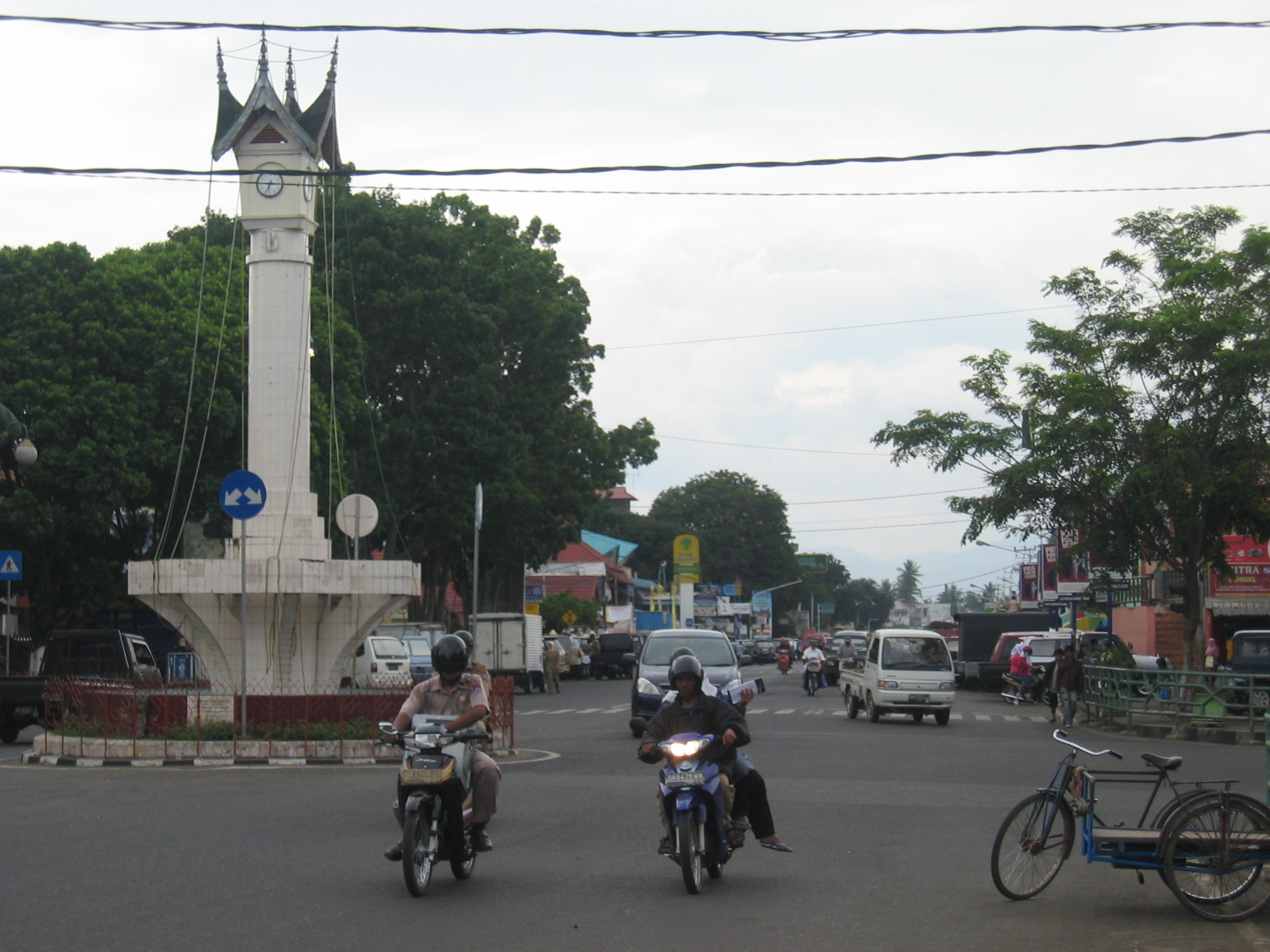
Main street of Payakumbuh.

Payakumbuh is connected to Padang and Pekanbaru by road; a dysfunctional railway line also exists. For inner-city transport, Payakumbuh employs a public transportation system known as "Sago", taken from name of a nearby volcano (Mount Sago) in Payakumbuh. In addition, transport within the city occurs in the form of horse-drawn carts known as bendi.

== Administrative districts ==
The city is administratively divided into five administrative districts (kecamatan), 8 kanagarian, and 47 subdistricts (kelurahan). A mayor (walikota) leads the city administration. The districts are listed below with their areas and their populations at the 2010 Census and 2020 Census, together with the official estimates as of mid 2025. The table also includes the locations of the administrative centres and the number of urban villages (kelurahan) in each district.

| Name of District (kecamatan) | Area in km^{2} | Pop'n 2010 Census | Pop'n 2020 Census | Pop'n end 2025 Estimate | Admin centre | No. of urban villages |
|---|---|---|---|---|---|---|
| Payakumbuh Barat (West Payakumbuh) | 19.07 | 45,848 | 54,534 | 57,900 | Tanjuang Pauah | 17 |
| Payakumbah Selatan (South Payakumbuh) | 14.68 | 9,388 | 11,990 | 13,180 | Sawah Padang; Aua Kuniang | 6 |
| Payakumbuh Timur (East Payakumbuh) | 22.73 | 24,466 | 29,325 | 31,250 | Tiakar | 9 |
| Payakumbuh Utara (North Payakumbuh) | 14.53 | 28,461 | 32,242 | 33,430 | Tigo Koto Diate | 9 |
| Lamposi Tigo Nagori | 9.42 | 8,662 | 11,485 | 12,850 | Sungai Durian | 6 |
| Totals | 80.43 | 116,825 | 139,576 | 148,600 | Kapalo Koto Dibalal | 47 |

== Tourism ==
Payakumbuh is considered as one of the most popular cities in West Sumatra for domestic and foreign tourists. The varieties of food, the Muslim clothes stores, and natural scenery are some of the attractions of the city. Attractions within and surrounding the city include:

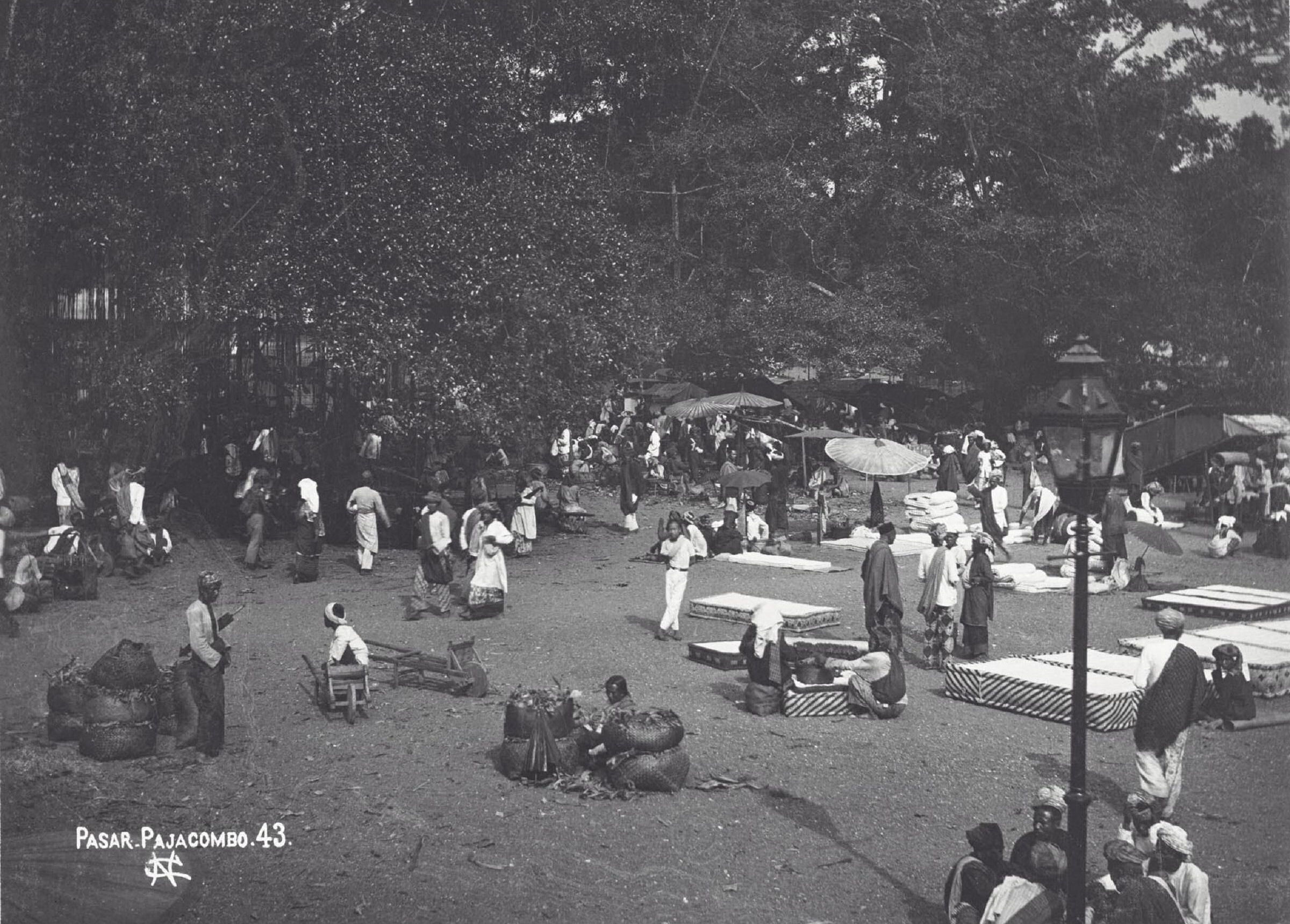
Payakumbuh market c. 1900.

- Harau Valley: A karstic valley with immense, steep cliffs and spectacular waterfalls. Rock climbing is quite popular in this area due to the ideal conditions of the precipices.
- Ngalau Indah Caverns and Caves: Caves with fantastic stalactites and stalagmites and including views of Payakumbuh and its surroundings.
- Kepala Bonda: Site which can be visited for bamboo river-rafting.
- Rumah Godang Sungai Baringin, a large and splendid rumah gadang (a traditional home of the Minangkabau people), located between rice fields
- Koto Nan Ampek Old Mosque: Among the oldest mosques in West Sumatra, characterized by traditional Minangkabau architecture.
- Museum Rumah Kelahiran Tan Malaka (Museum of Tan Malaka Birthplace): the house in which Indonesian founding father Tan Malaka was born.
