= Legokjawa Racecourse =

Horse racing venue in West Java

Legokjawa Racecourse ᮃᮛᮦᮔᮘᮜᮕᮔ᮪ᮊᮥᮓᮜᮨᮌᮧᮊ᮪ᮏᮝ
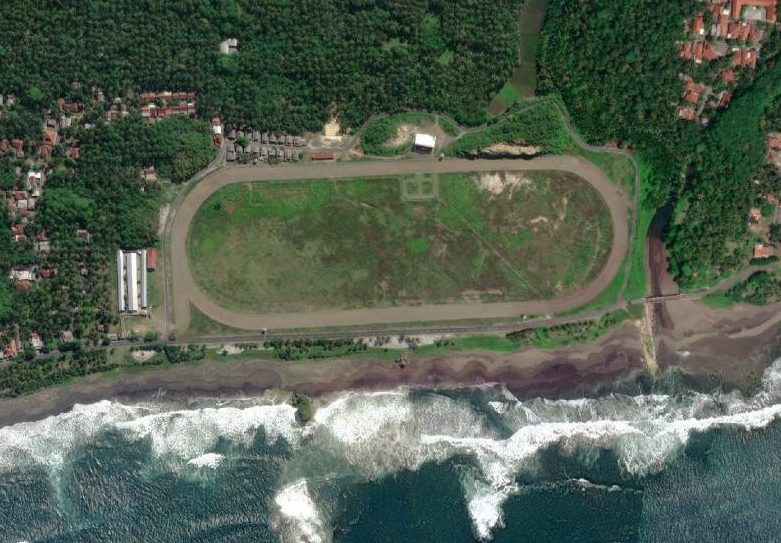
- Aerial photo of Legokjawa Racecourse
- Interactive map of Legokjawa Racecourse ᮃᮛᮦᮔᮘᮜᮕᮔ᮪ᮊᮥᮓᮜᮨᮌᮧᮊ᮪ᮏᮝ
- Location: Pangandaran Regency, West Java, Indonesia
- Coordinates: 7.808974°S 108.457412°E
- Owned by: Government of Pangandaran Regency
- Operated by: Pordasi
- Date opened: 2000s
- Race type: Flat
- Course type: Dirt
- Notable races: Indonesia Derby; 2016 Pekan Olahraga Nasional

Legokjawa Racecourse (Sundanese: ᮃᮛᮦᮔᮘᮜᮕᮔ᮪ᮊᮥᮓᮜᮨᮌᮧᮊ᮪ᮏᮝ) is a racecourse located in Pangandaran Regency, West Java, Indonesia. This racecourse is unique because it has a racing track with a panoramic view of the open sea of the Indian Ocean, making it the only horse racing track in Indonesia that has such a view.

Built in the early 2000s, Legokjawa frequently hosts national and regional horse racing championships, including being the location for the 2016 West Java PON XIX and major events such as the Merdeka Cup.

== History ==
Construction of Legokjawa initially began in the early 2000s. However, extensive construction and significant upgrades to key facilities occurred in the lead-up to Legokjawa's appointment as host of the equestrian competition at the 19th West Java National Games (PON) in 2016. Construction of the horse stables at the Legokjawa began around May 2016.

== Physical attributes ==
Legokjawa covers 18 hectares of land, with a 1,200-meter-long, 16-meter-wide oval track made of full-dirt sand. The racecourse also features a 300-meter straightaway.
