= Cor van Gogh =

Brother of Vincent van Gogh (1867–1900)

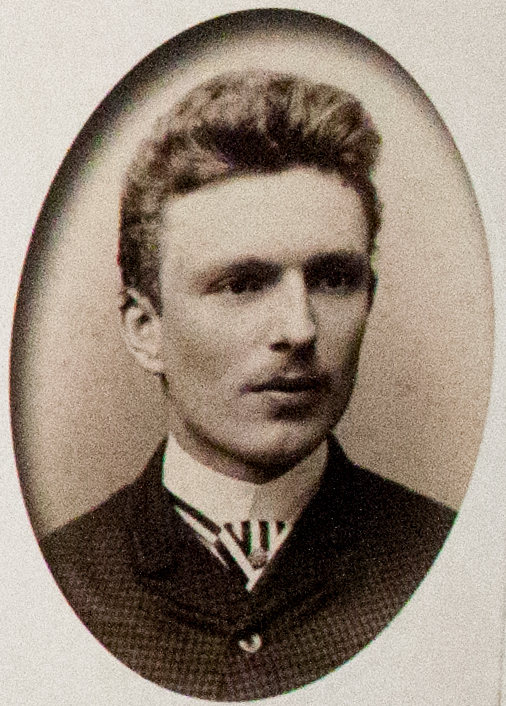
- Born: Cornelis van Gogh; 17 May 1867; Zundert, Netherlands
- Died: April 14, 1900 (aged 32); Brandfort, South Africa
- Occupation: Draughtsman, Soldier
- Relatives: Vincent van Gogh (brother); Theo van Gogh (brother); Wil van Gogh (sister)

Cornelis van Gogh (17 May 1867 – 14 April 1900) was a Dutch immigrant and draughtsman who fought and died in South Africa with the Boer foreign volunteers during the Anglo Boer War. He was the youngest brother of the artist Vincent van Gogh.

== Youth ==
Cornelis van Gogh was born on 17 May 1867, to a middle-class couple, Theodorus and Anna. He was the third boy and youngest brother of Vincent van Gogh and siblings Theo, Anna, Elisabeth "Lies", and Wil.

His more famous brother Vincent was 14 when Cor was born. Over the years, Van Gogh and his sister Wil lived in Zundert, Helvoirt, Etten and Nuenen. Unlike his eldest brother, Van Gogh followed a technical career path. In April 1885, just before he turned 18, Van Gogh began an apprenticeship at a factory in Helmond. In 1887, he moved to Lincoln, England, where he honed his technical skills. In 1889, at the age of twenty-two, he emigrated to the Zuid-Afrikaansche Republiek. By the time he arrived, the small gold diggers had been excluded by large mining magnates who united in 1889 to form the Chamber of Mines. Van Gogh worked on a mine in Germiston and then, in 1890, (in the same year as his brother's suicide), began working as a draftsman for the Dutch South African Railway Company (N.Z.A.S.M.), where for 10 years the railway line network was extended.

== Anglo–Boer War and death ==
Van Gogh left the Netherlands for South Africa at the outbreak of the Second Boer War (1899–1902). In Pretoria, he was employed to make technical drawings for the Netherlands-South African Railway Company (Nederlandsh-Zuid-Afrikaansche Spoorweg Maatschappij). There, he married Anna Eva Catherina Fuchs, a German-born Roman Catholic, in February 1898. His wife abandoned the marriage eight months later, taking their possessions. Following the end of the marriage, he joined the Foreigners Battalion to fight the British. Van Gogh and his fellow volunteers fared badly in combat. He was admitted to a Red Cross hospital with a fever. The ill-supplied hospital lacked Dutch physicians and nurses, who had just been evacuated.

Van Gogh was left in possession of his pistol and on 14 April 1900, he shot himself in his hospital bed, perhaps accidentally. He was 32 years old. His mother was under the impression that he had died in combat.

== See also ==
- Vincent van Gogh's family in his art
