= Wil van Gogh =

Sister of Vincent van Gogh (1862–1941)

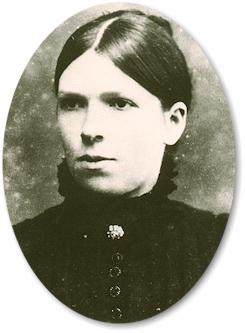
- Wil van Gogh in c. 1880
- Born: Wilhelmina Jacoba van Gogh; 16 March 1862; Zundert, Netherlands
- Died: 17 May 1941 (aged 79); Ermelo, Reichskommissariat Niederlande
- Occupations: Nurse; feminist
- Relatives: Vincent van Gogh (brother); Theo van Gogh (brother); Cor van Gogh (brother)

Wilhelmina Jacoba van Gogh (Note: Also spelt Willemien Jacoba van Gogh) (Dutch pronunciation: [ʋɪl(ɦɛlˈminaː jaːˈkoːbaː) vɑŋ ˈɣɔx]; 16 March 1862 – 17 May 1941) was a nurse, teacher of scripture, and early Dutch feminist. She was the youngest and best-known sister of artist Vincent van Gogh, who she was close to, and the art dealer Theo van Gogh.

== Life ==
Wilhelmina Jacoba van Gogh was born on 16 March 1862, in Zundert, Netherlands, daughter of Theodorus van Gogh and Anna Cornelia Carbentus. She had three brothers Vincent, Theo, and Cor, and two sisters Elisabeth (Lise) and Anna. Wil and Vincent were close at an early age. They both had difficulties at school, both "rejected society's prevailing norms" and were "socially engaged and very creative," and "struggled with their mental health, which they discussed openly with each other." Van Gogh never married or had children.

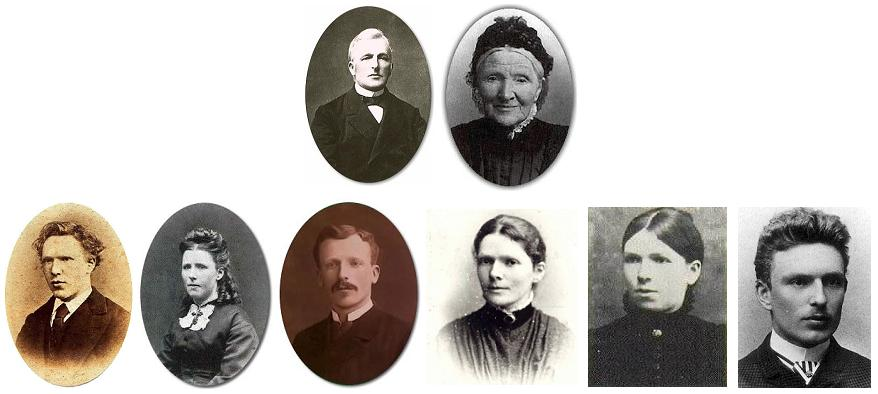
Van Gogh Family. Theodorus (Dorus) and Anna van Gogh; children Vincent, Anna, Theo, Elizabeth (Lies), Wilhelmina (Wil), and Cornelius (Cor)

During the first part of her life, Van Gogh served her family and others, nursing the sick. When her mother broke her leg, Van Gogh nursed her to health, with Vincent saying in a letter, "What Wil does is exemplary, exemplary. I shan't easily forget that." When her brother Theo married Jo van Gogh-Bonger, who was later to play such a crucial role in promoting Vincent's posthumous reputation, Van Gogh was helpful to the couple, staying with them in Paris. After the birth of Theo and Jo's baby, Vincent Willem, she spent over a month helping out the new mother. The doctor remarked on her care of Jo, saying she "was much too good to get married," but Theo wrote to Vincent saying he hoped she would. Theo took her to the house of painter Edgar Degas, with whom he had a good relationship as an art dealer. Although Degas was often a difficult person, he took to Van Gogh during the visit, bringing out many works of art. Theo wrote that "she had a good eye for female nudes."

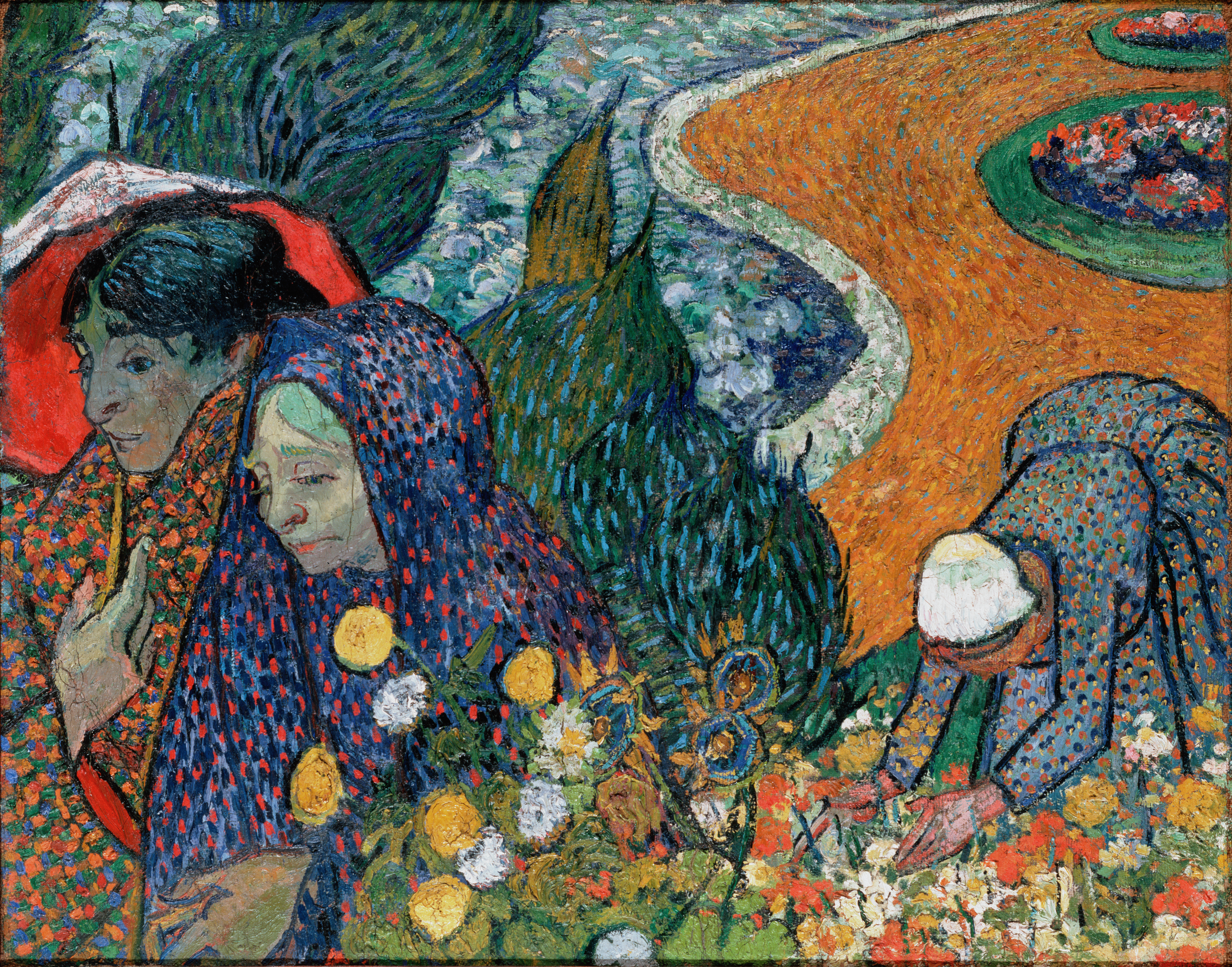
Memory of the Garden at Etten Vincent van Gogh, 1888. Oil on canvas. Vincent sent Wil a pen and ink drawing of the portraits in a letter c. 12 November 1888.

Unlike her other two sisters, she was close to Vincent and the two wrote each other frequently, about art and literature, but also about their own mental health struggles. She was concerned when Vincent was admitted to a psychiatric facility. He had written to her directly, telling her about three attacks he had suffered and his entry into the hospital at Saint-Rémy. He wrote Wil that the physician their brother Theo had sent to examine him said he was not insane, nor did alcohol precipitate moodiness, but that his seizures were epileptic, also an affliction of his mother's sister. He wrote to her about his art, some letters drafted over several days, so that she knew of his Arles sunflower paintings, the postman, and the terrace, as well as the countryside around Arles. He told her of the clarity of the air and the sharp and bright colours, especially cobalt blue. Vincent also gifted her paintings, some of which he created especially for her, catering to her preferences. She lived with their mother, Vincent wanted the two to have a collection of his works that they could display at home. A month before his death, Vincent wrote her that he wished to paint her portrait, but he died before the two could arrange anything. Although many letters from Vincent to Wil are preserved, her correspondence to him is lost.

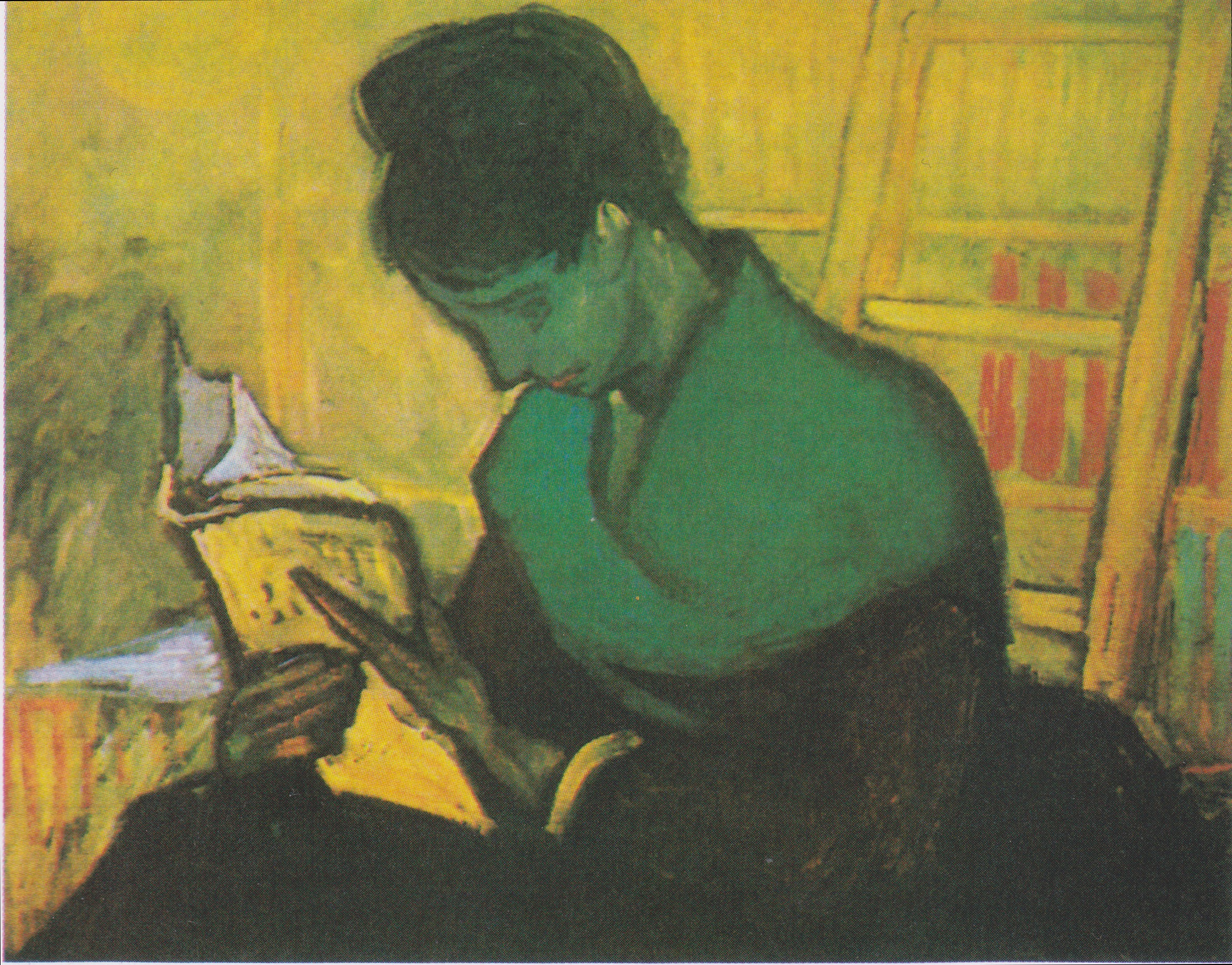
The Novel Reader, Vincent van Gogh, 1888. Private collection (F497)

After Vincent's death, Wil wrote a letter to her brother Theo, saying in part, "We should not begrudge him his peace, but how hard it will be for you." Within six months, her brother Theo was dead as well. After the death of her brothers in 1890 and 1891, she undertook studies to become a scripture teacher, passing her entrance exam in theology education in September 1890, and qualifying in 1893. She taught briefly in Nijmegen and then moved to The Hague, and her mother moved there to live with her. Wil became active in women's organizations in The Hague, becoming a member of the Dameslees Museum (Library Museum for Ladies). An old friend of hers, Margaretha Meijboom, with whom she had shared Vincent's letters to her, was a member of the board. The library's collection contained books on socio-economic issues, held magazine and periodical subscriptions, and was a meeting place for women in The Hague. Although not a member of the board, Wil found in the institution "the place that would lead her to engage as a more active member of the women's rights movement."

As the daughter of a Dutch Reformed pastor and a certified teacher of scripture, Van Gogh was somewhat unusual as a Dutch feminist. She joined the movement with other friends, including Marie Jungius and Marie Mensing, who were part of the organizing committee for an exhibition of the "National Exhibition of Women's Labor" (Nationale Tentoonstelling van Vrouwenarbeid) in 1898. Van Gogh played a substantial role in the exhibition, held in Scheveningseweg in The Hague. The ten-week exhibit had some 90,000 visitors and was a highly profitable enterprise; funds raised from the exhibition, 20,000 Dutch guilders, served to establish the Dutch National Bureau for Women's Labor. Conservative Christian women and men were warned to stay away from the exhibition, with its "poisonous impropriety."

No sources record what happened, but on 4 December 1902, van Gogh was interned and later transferred to the House Veldwijk, a psychiatric institution at Ermelo. The diagnosis of dementia praecox, on which this measure was based, was at the time considered a fatal illness. Asylum records later noted:

There has been no significant change in the condition of this long-standing patient. She remains solitary and withdrawn, rarely speaks and generally does not respond to questions. She spends her entire day in the same place in the lounge, sitting in her chair and gazing blankly at her surroundings. She has refused food for years and has to be fed artificially...

Van Gogh remained at Ermelo for almost four decades before she died there on 17 May 1941. She was the last surviving of the Van Gogh siblings. The works that Vincent had gifted her were in safe keeping with her sister-in-law Jo, and on Jo's death in 1925, Jo's son Vincent Willem sold a few of his aunt's paintings in order to pay for her hospital placement in Veldwijk.

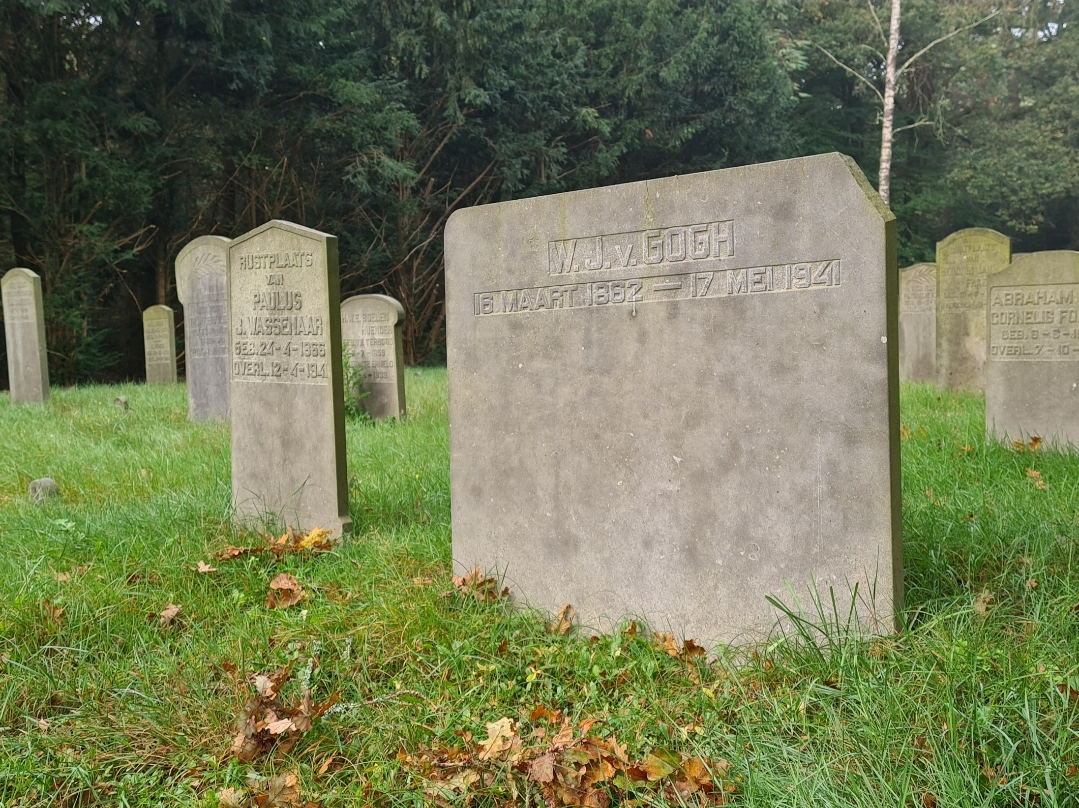
Grave of Wil van Gogh at Veldwijk cemetery in Ermelo

Whether she was mentally ill or not is nowadays difficult to prove. Renate Berger asserts that Wil van Gogh shared the fate of many "sisters of well-known men" at the time.

== See also ==
- Feminism in the Netherlands
- Van Gogh's family in his art
