= Van Gogh's family in his art =

Memory of the Garden at Etten
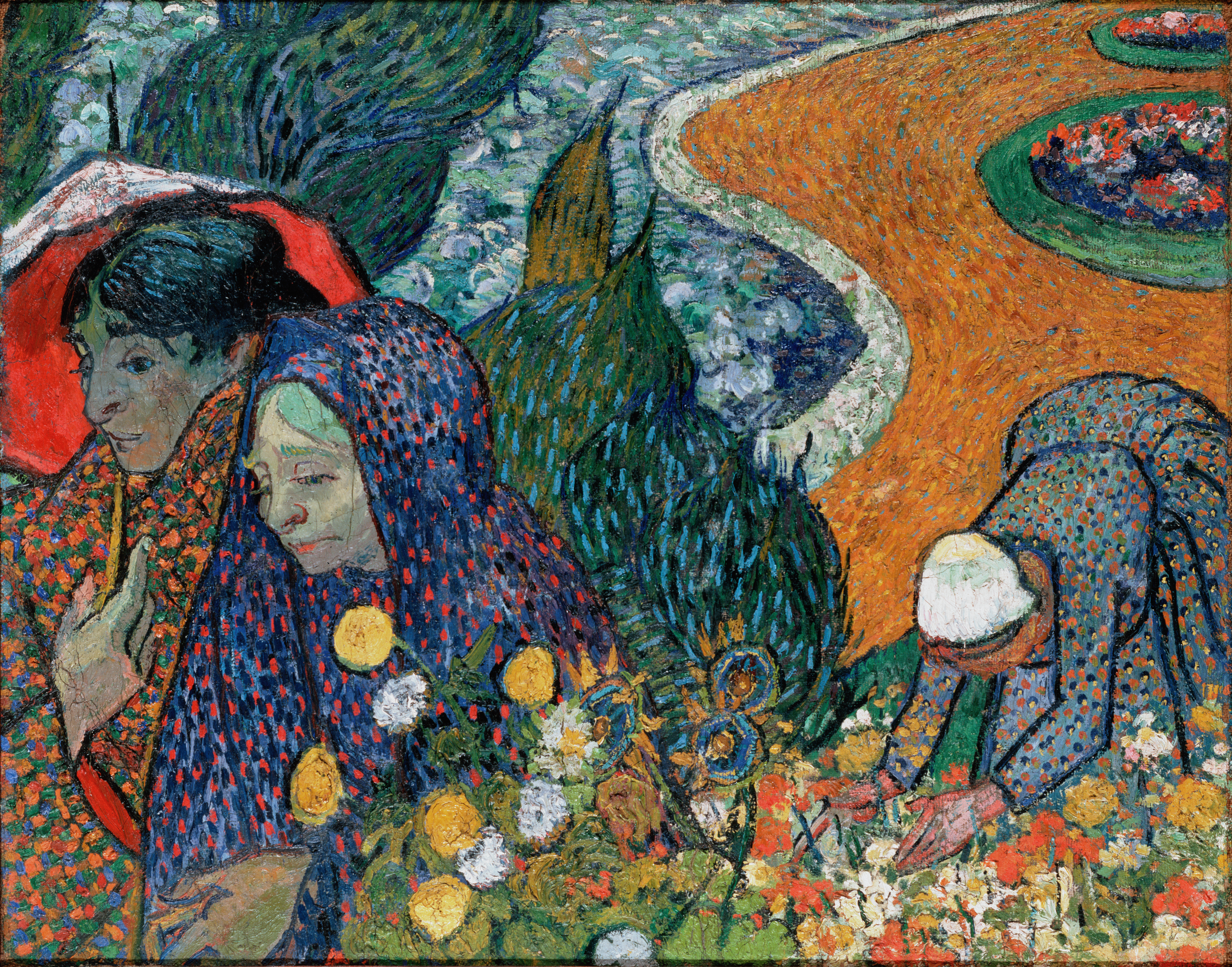
- Artist: Vincent van Gogh
- Year: 1888
- Catalogue: F496; JH1630
- Medium: Oil on canvas
- Location: The Hermitage, St. Petersburg, Russia

Van Gogh's family in his art refers to works that Vincent van Gogh made for or about Van Gogh family members. In 1881, Vincent drew a portrait of his grandfather, also named Vincent van Gogh, and his sister Wil. While living in Nuenen, Vincent memorialized his father in Still Life with Bible following his death in 1885. There he also made many paintings and drawings in 1884 and 1885 of his parents' vicarage, its garden and the church. At the height of his career in Arles he made Portrait of the Artist's Mother, Memory of the Garden at Etten of his mother and sister and Novel Reader, which is thought to be of his sister, Wil.

While van Gogh was at the Saint-Paul Asylum, Saint-Remy, he made several paintings as gifts for his mother and sister, and the painting Almond Blossoms for his brother Theo and his wife Johanna to celebrate the birth of their son, whom they named Vincent.

== Vincent van Gogh (grandfather) ==
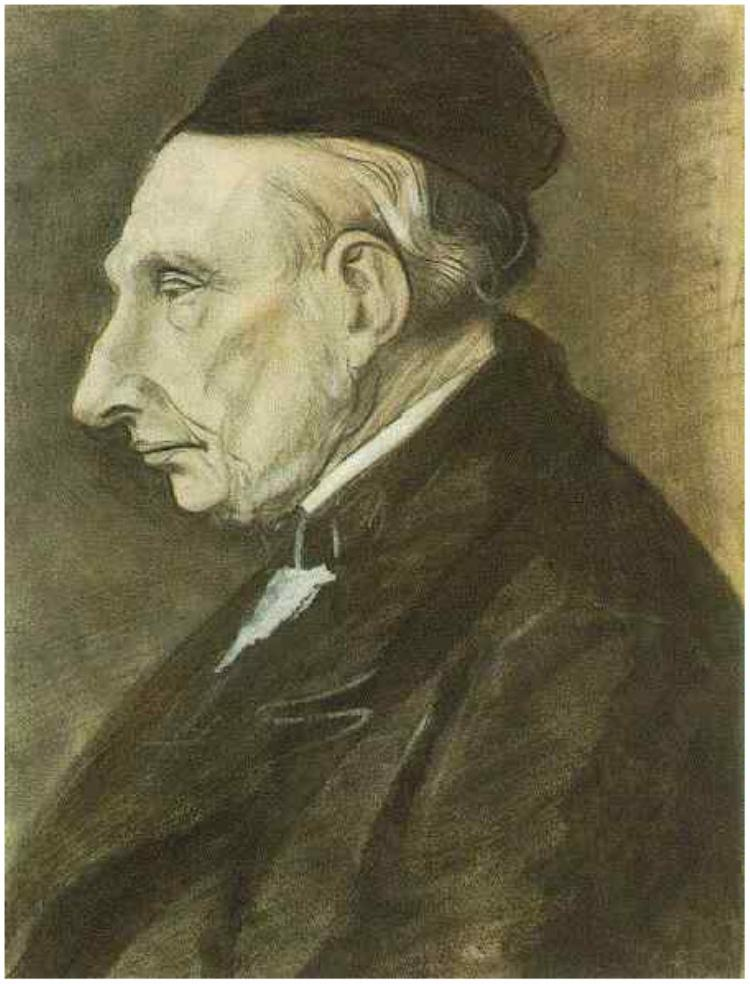
Vincent van Gogh, Portrait of Vincent van Gogh, the artist's grandfather, 1881, Van Gogh Museum, Amsterdam

Vincent van Gogh's grandfather (born 1789) was also named Vincent van Gogh. According to the artist's first biographer, his sister-in-law Johanna van Gogh, the grandfather was a pastor, and the son of Johanna van der Vin of Malines and Johannes van Gogh. Johanna van Gogh writes that Johannes "was at first a gold-wire drawer like his father, but he later became a Bible teacher and a clerk in the Cloister Church at The Hague." She describes him as an intellectual, duty-bound man who was awarded prizes and testimonials for his distinguished work. A family legacy, from his great-uncle—a sculptor and a lifelong bachelor—allowed Vincent van Gogh (the elder) to study divinity at the University of Leiden. After successfully completing his studies and having become established at the parsonage of Benschop, he married E. H. Vrydag in 1810. They remained married until Elisabeth's death on 7 March 1857; the Reverend Vincent van Gogh lived until 1874.

In July 1881, Vincent (the younger) made Portrait of Artist's Grandfather (F876). The work was drawn in pencil and brown ink, with opaque white watercolor and a brown wash. The drawing is owned by the Van Gogh Museum in Amsterdam.

== Father and mother ==
=== Theodorus van Gogh ===
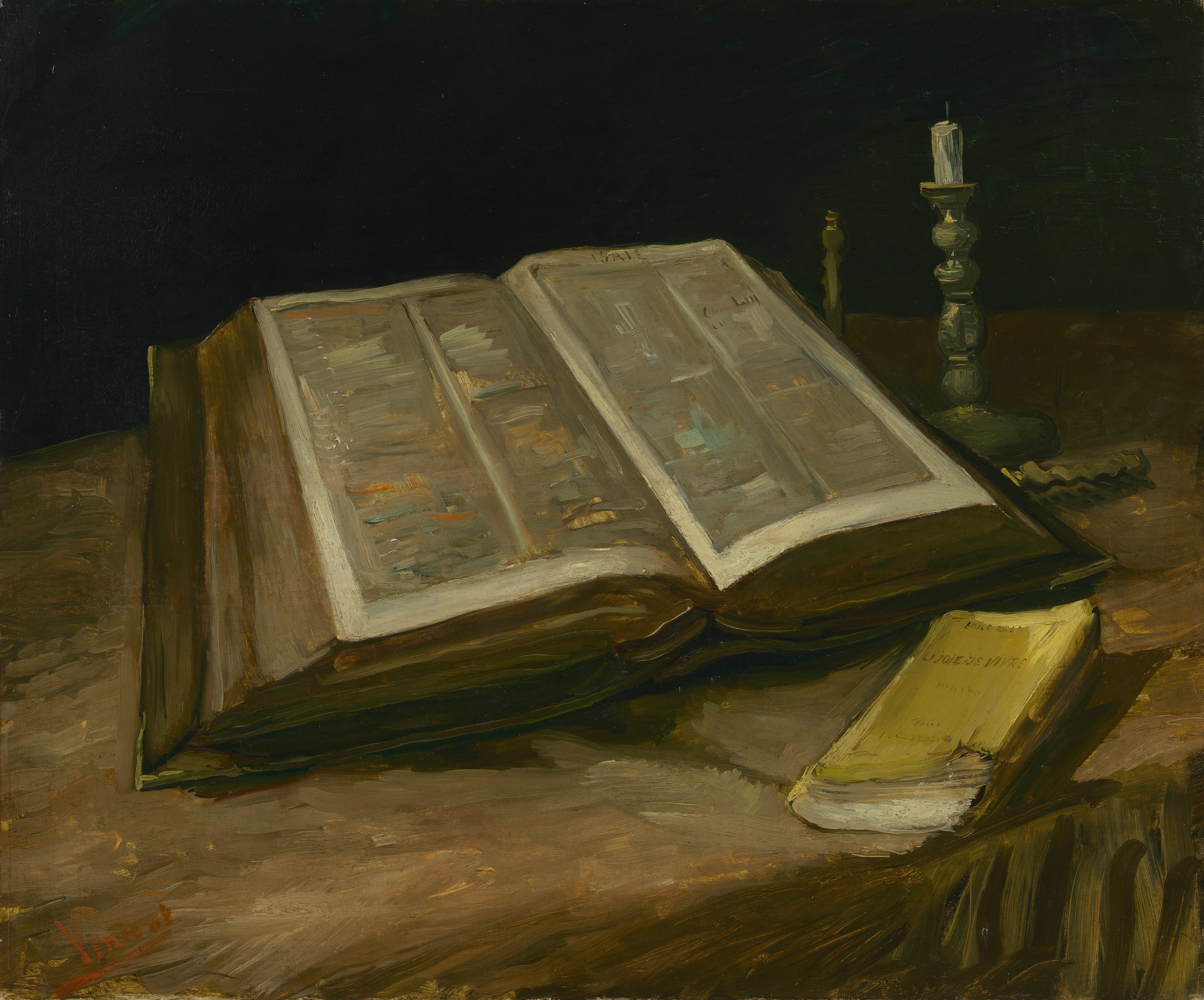
Still Life with Bible, 1885, Van Gogh Museum, Amsterdam (F117)

Theodorus van Gogh was born 8 February 1822, one of eleven children and the only one of six brothers to become a pastor like his father. Theodorus graduated from Utrecht in 1849 after successfully completing his theology program, which allowed him to secure a position as pastor in Groot-Zundert, a village in the North Brabant region of the Netherlands. He was confirmed by his father, Vincent van Gogh, in Zundert on 1 April 1849. Reverend Theodorus van Gogh was pastor of the Protestant Dutch Reformed Church, which adhered to Calvinist doctrine. In May 1851, Theodorus married Anna Cornelia Carbentus, whose father was in the book business. According to Johanna van Gogh, Theodorus was a handsome man, "he was called the handsome parson by some, he had an amiable character and fine spiritual qualities." Vincent van Gogh made a painting of his father's Dutch Authorized Bible in Still Life with Bible (F117) months after Theodorus' sudden death in March 1885. The Bible symbolizes his father's faith, which Vincent saw as mired in convention. He painted the page open to the passage of Isaiah 53. He placed Émile Zola's novel La Joie de vivre (English: The Joy of Living) in front of the Bible which to him likely symbolized worldliness. The burned out candle shows an extinguishment—perhaps both of the father's life and of Vincent's faith.

=== Anna van Gogh ===
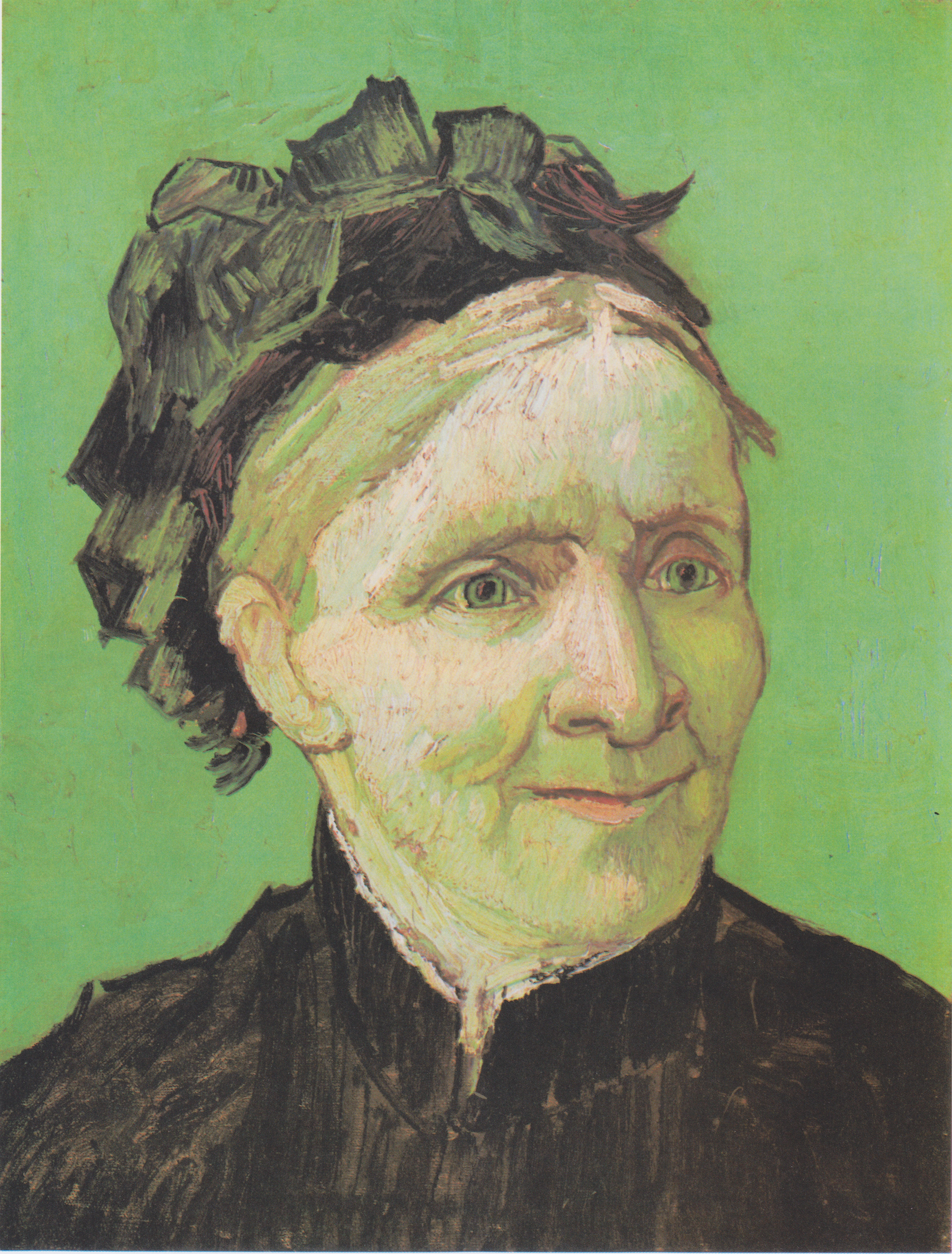
Portrait of Artist's Mother, October 1888, The Norton Simon Museum of Art, Pasadena, California (F477)

Anna Cornelia Carbentus was born 10 September 1819 at The Hague to Willem Carbentus, who was a royal bookbinder. Her younger sister Cornelia married Theodorus' brother, Vincent van Gogh, the art dealer, and her older sister married a clergyman named Stricker. Anna became a devout and helpful clergyman's wife, helping her husband in the parish. She enjoyed art and was artistically inclined, "filling notebooks with drawings of plants and flowers" and studied painting with Hendrik van de Sande Bakhuyzen. She outlived her three grown sons and her husband, yet still retained "her energy and spirit and bore her sorrow with rare courage."

Portrait of the Artist's Mother (Van Gogh) (F477) was based upon a black-and-white photograph of his mother. Vincent's mother appears to be a respectable middle class woman, attentive and proud, against a green background.

Van Gogh painted Memory of the Garden at Etten (F496) to hang in his bedroom. He envisioned the older woman was his mother and the younger in a plaid shawl his sister Wil. To Wil he said he had "an impression of you like those in Dickens' novels." Wil stands behind her mother in the painting. Behind them is a woman bent over working the garden. Mother and daughter fill the foreground of the left picture frame, seemingly walking out of the scene. In a letter to his sister he described the painting:

"The younger of the two ladies who are out for a walk is wearing a Scottish shawl with green and orange checks, and a red parasol. The old lady has a violet shawl, nearly black. But a bunch of dahlias, some of them citron yellow, the others pink and white mixed, are like an explosion of color on the somber figure. Behind them a few cedar shrubs and emerald-green cypresses. Behind the cypresses one sees a field of pale green and red cabbages, surrounded by a border of little white flowers. The sandy path is of a raw orange color; the foliage of the two beds of scarlet geraniums is very green. Finally, the interjacent plane, there is a maid-servant, dressed in blue, who is arranging a profusion of plants with white, pink, yellow and vermilion-red flowers."

"Here you are. I know this is hardly what one might call a likeness, but for me it renders the poetic character and the style of the garden as I feel it. All the same, let us suppose that the two ladies out for a walk are you and our mother; let us even suppose that there is not the least, absolutely not the least vulgar and fatuous resemblance – yet the deliberate choice of color, the somber violet with the blotch of violent citron yellow of the dahlias, suggests Mother's personality to me."

"The figure in the Scotch plaid with orange and green checks stands out against the somber green of the cypress, which contrast is further accentuated by the red parasol – this figure gives me an impression of you like those in Dickens's novels, a vaguely representative figure."

As he rose to the height of his career, Vincent enjoyed passing on prized paintings to his family. "Great bouquets of flowers, violet-colored irises, great bouquets of roses," went to his mother. Another example, "the most resolved and stylized of the three" paintings of women picking olives was made for his sister and mother.

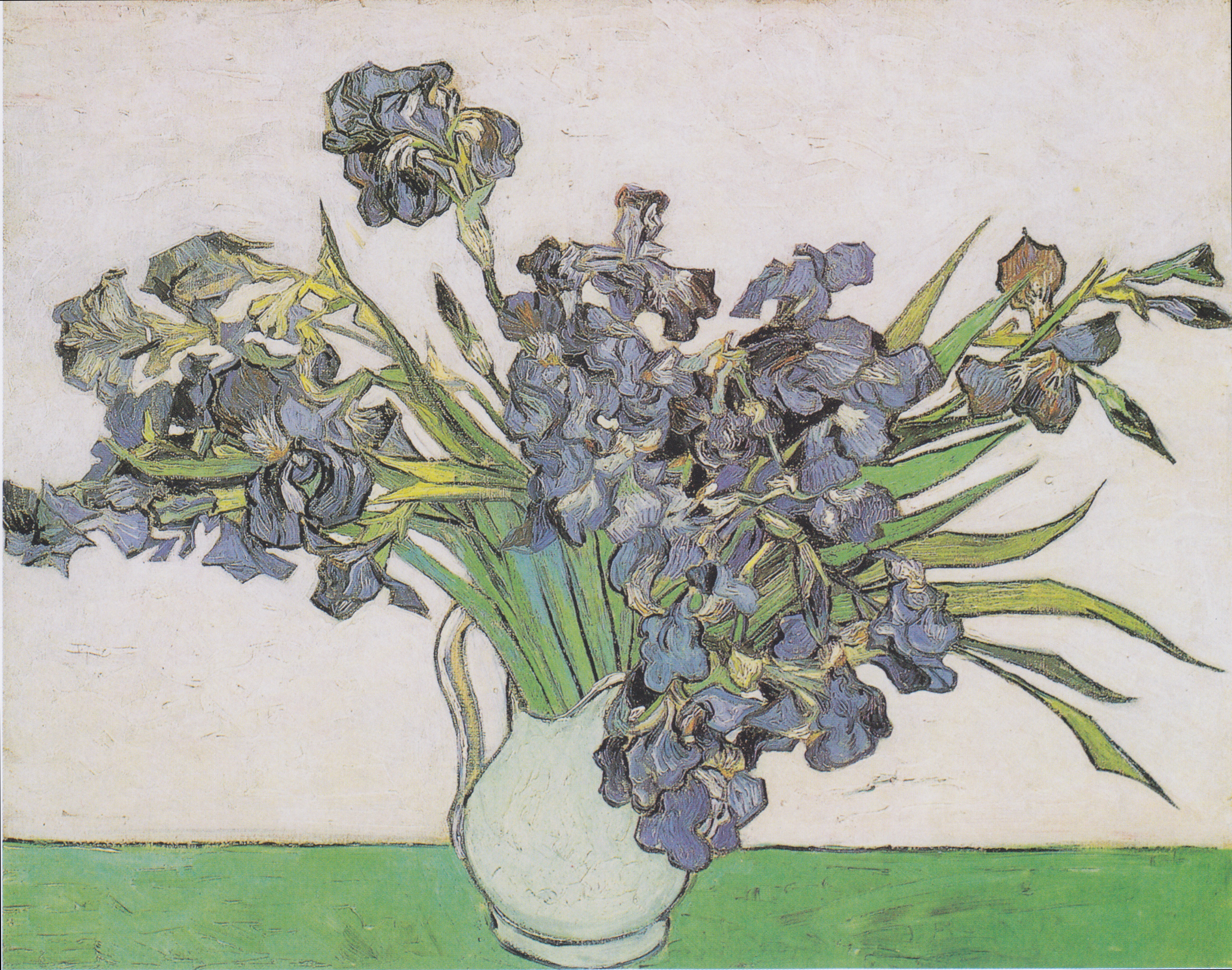
Still Life: Vase with Irises
May 1890
The Metropolitan Museum of Art, New York (F680)

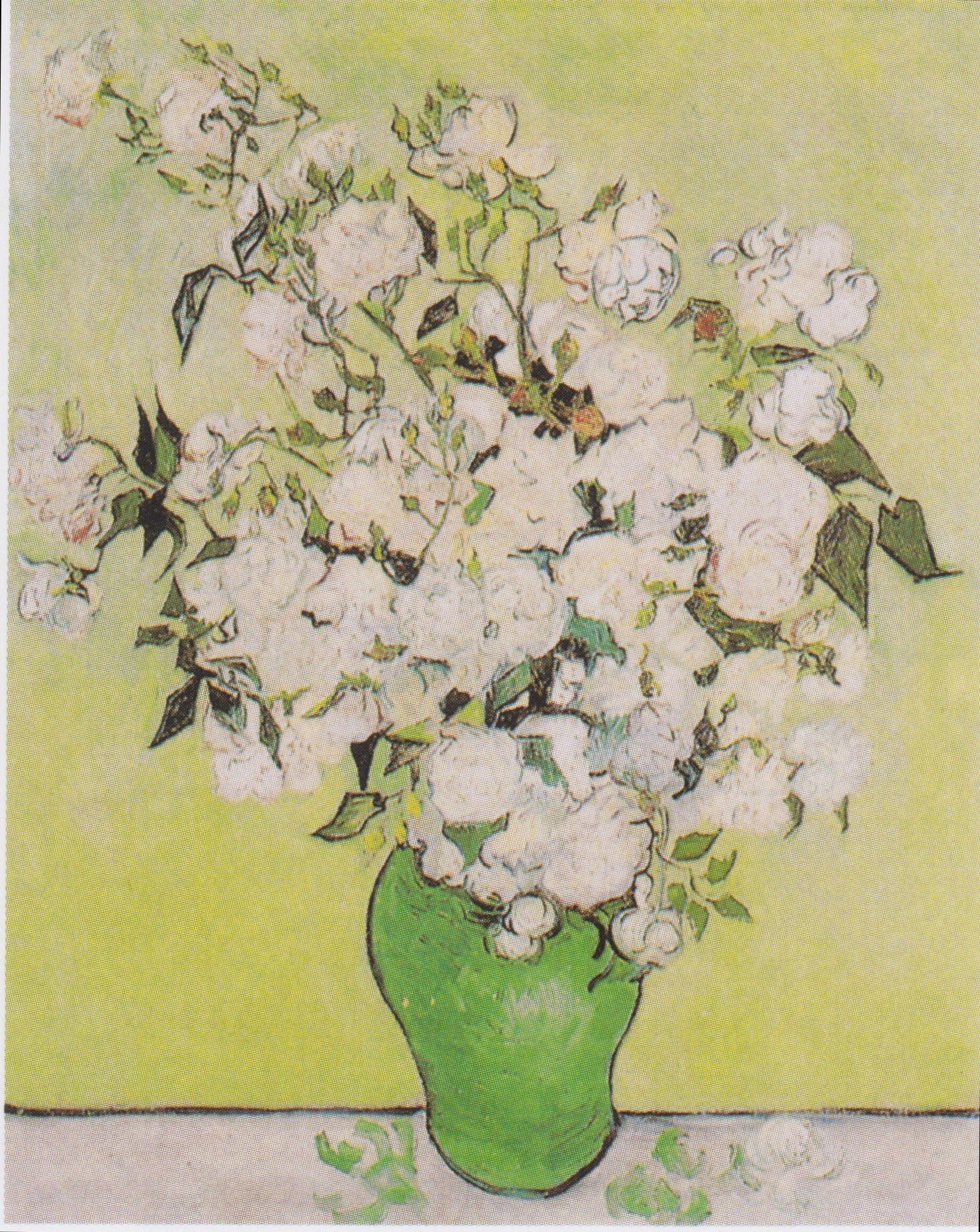
Still Life: Pink Roses in a Vase
May 1890
The Metropolitan Museum of Art, New York (F682)

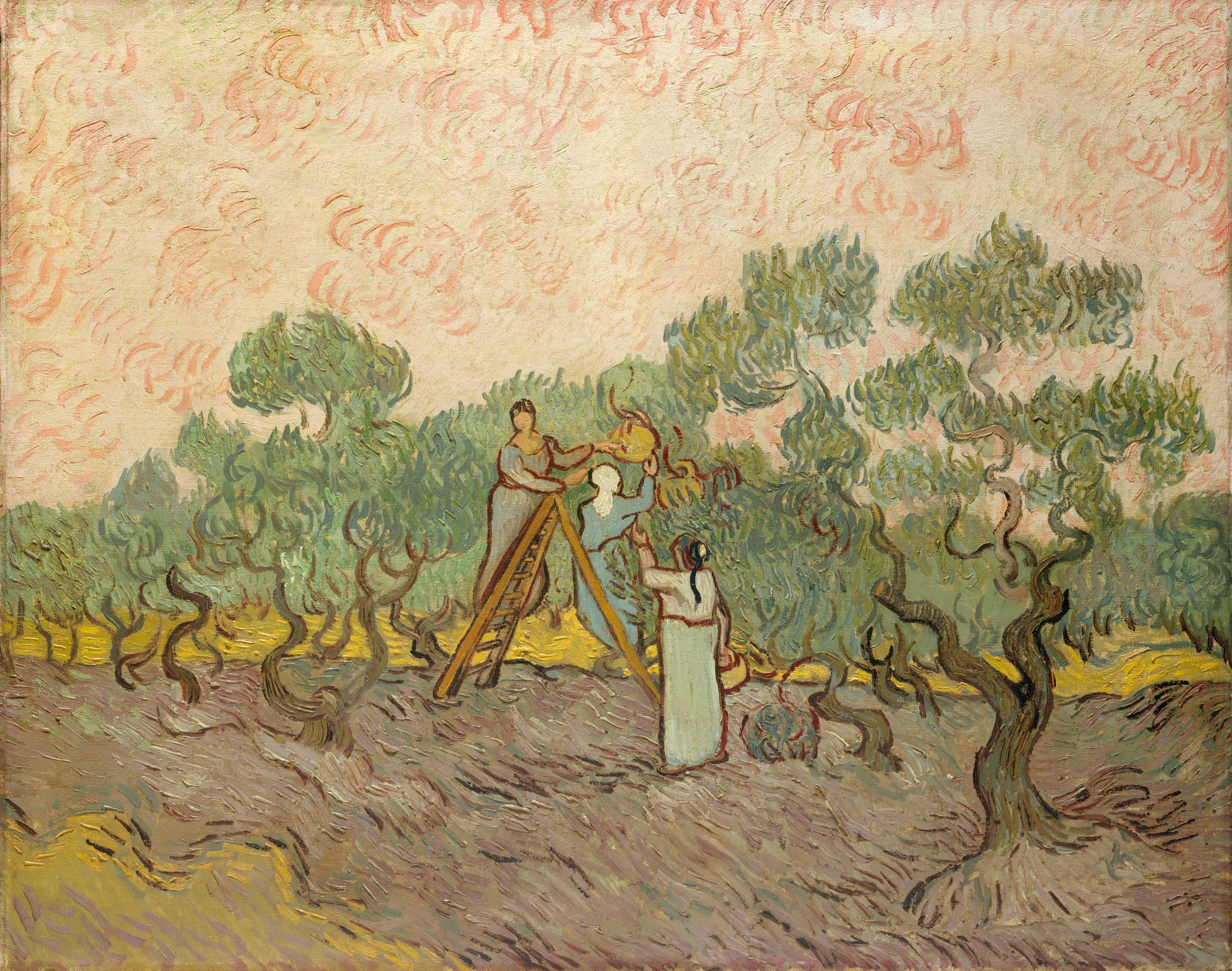
Women Picking Olives
December 1889
72.4×89.9
Metropolitan Museum of Art, New York (F655)

== Family ==
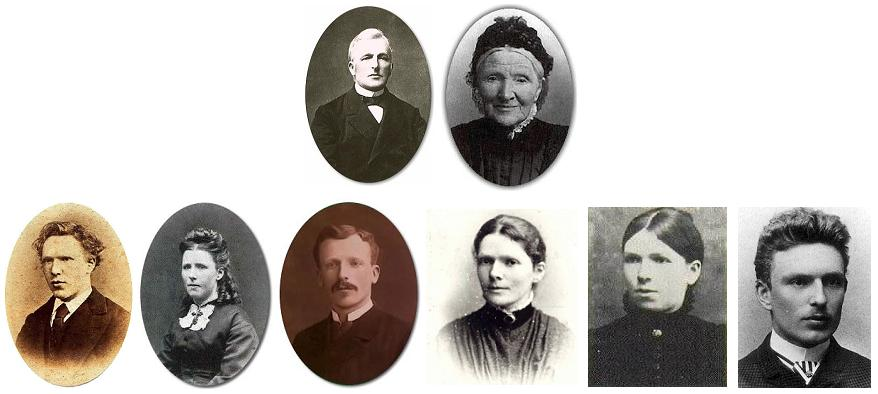
Theodorus and Anna van Gogh's family, including Vincent, Anna, Theo, Elizabeth, Wilhelmien and Cornelius

Anna and Theodorus were both devoted to the communities they served, ensuring their deeds spoke as resolutely as Theodorus' Sunday sermons. Both mother and father believed that God always watched over them and encouraged their children to look for God's presence in nature, such as the shape of the clouds or in the many colors in the sunsets.

Vincent said in 1889, "Whatever I think on other points, our father and mother were exemplary as married people."

=== Vincent van Gogh ===
Vincent van Gogh was born on 30 March 1853, exactly one year after the stillborn delivery of Anna and Theodorus' first child who was named Vincent. As a child, he liked animals and flowers. In temperament, he was strong, energetic and strong-willed. Vincent enjoyed playing outdoors and made up games for his brothers and sisters, once rewarded with the most beautiful rose bush in the garden as his award. There were a few times that Vincent exhibited his artistic talent and upon receiving praise from his parents, he destroyed the items. He attended the local school but his interaction with the peasant boys was making him tough. As the family grew, a governess was brought in to tutor the children at the vicarage.

In 1864, Vincent, aged eleven, was sent away for schooling to a nearby boarding school in Zevenbergen which led to his lifelong feelings of being an exile. In 1866, his parents decided to send him to the new and prestigious Willem II College in Tilburg. In March 1868 Van Gogh suddenly returned home. During his two years at the Willem II College the painter C.C. Huijsmans had been his art class teacher. As Van Gogh entered adulthood the divide widened. After failing as an art dealer and in the ministry, he decided to become an artist. The more his family members suggested possible alternative vocations the greater the gulf between Vincent and his family. Further, Vincent's manner of dress, behavior and unusual love life was unsettling and embarrassing to the family. By 1881 Vincent had developed his personal view of the world and religion which was very different from his parents', finding organized religion too constrictive. He wrote to his brother, Theo, "I find Father and Mother's sermons and ideas about God, people, morality and virtue a lot of stuff and nonsense."

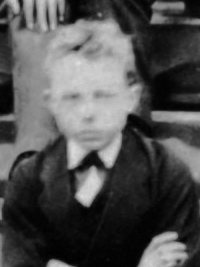
Photograph of Vincent van Gogh, age 13, 1866

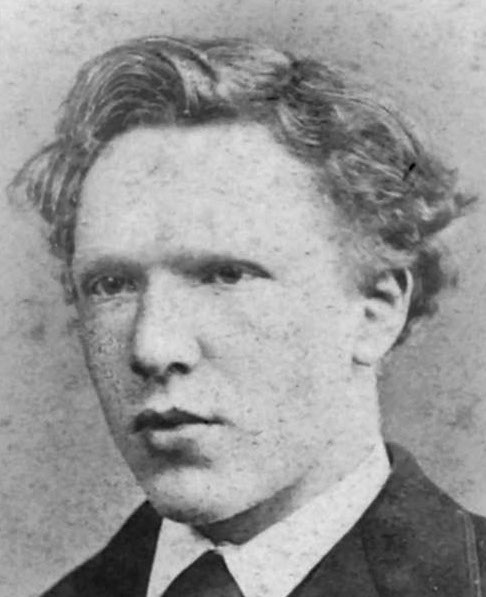
Photograph of Vincent van Gogh, age 19, 1873

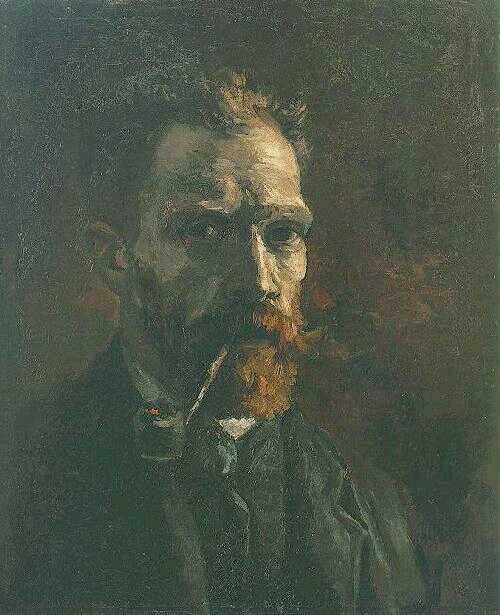
Self-Portrait with Pipe, 1886, Van Gogh Museum, Amsterdam (F180)

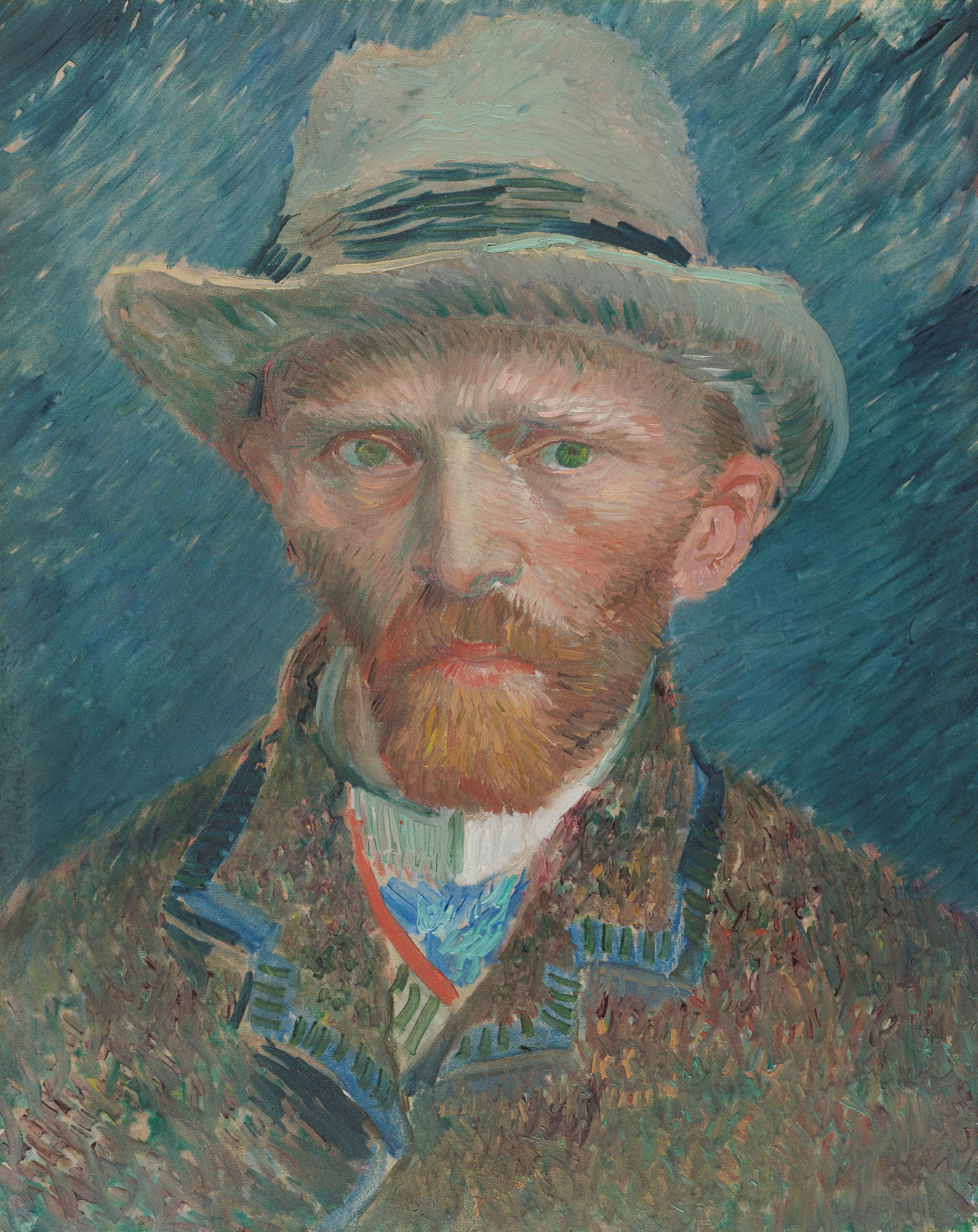
Self-Portrait with Grey Felt Hat, 1887, Oil on pasteboard, 42 cm x 34 cm. Rijksmuseum, Amsterdam (F295)

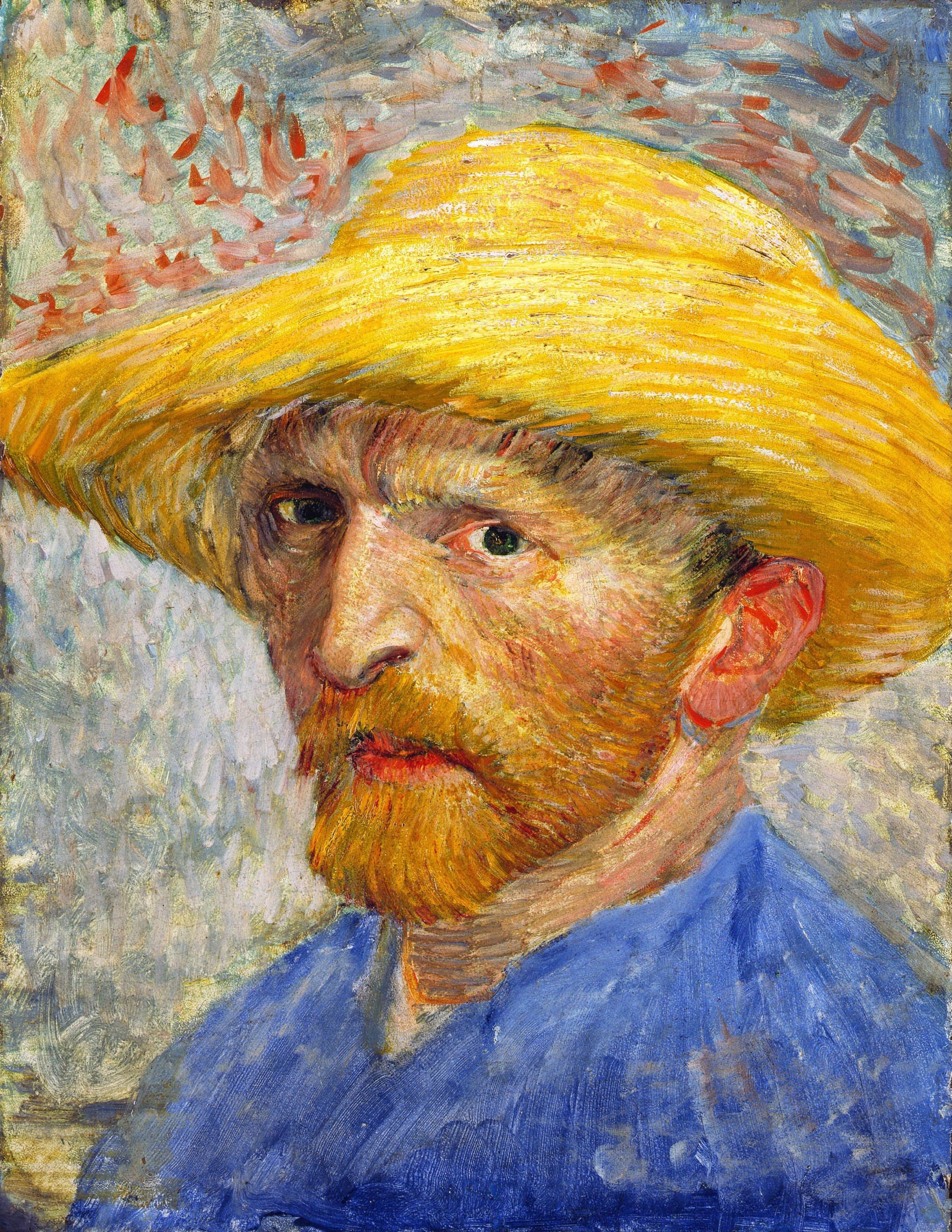
Self-Portrait with Straw Hat, Summer 1887, Oil on pasteboard, 24.9 × 26.7 cm, Detroit Institute of Arts (F526)

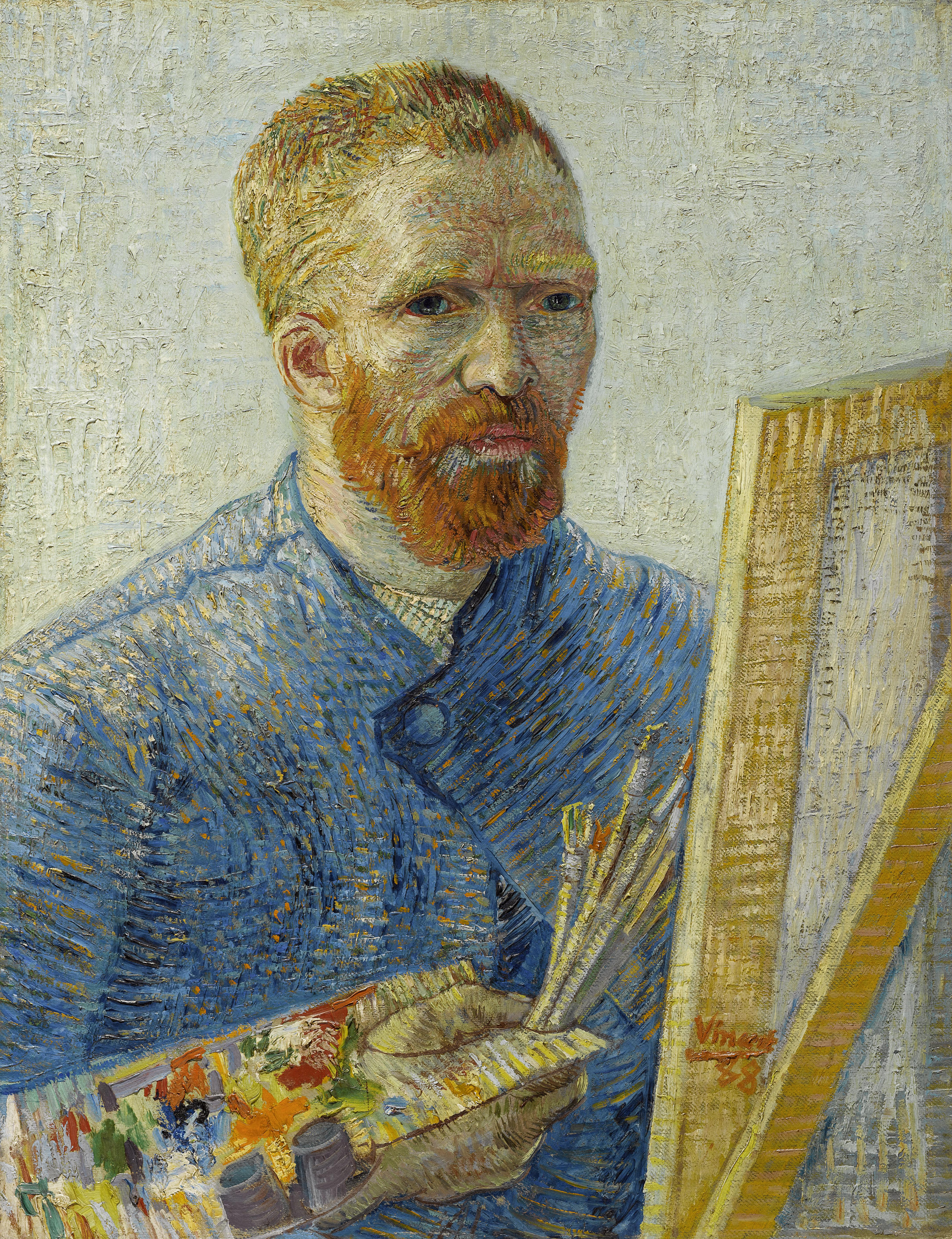
Self-Portrait as a Painter, December 1887 – February 1888, Oil on canvas, 65.1 cm × 50 cm
Van Gogh Museum, Amsterdam (F522)

=== Theo van Gogh ===
Theo van Gogh was born in Groot Zundert on 1 May 1857, four years after his brother Vincent. He was more tender, kind and delicately built but shared his older brother's reddish fair complexion and light blue eyes. Theo and Vincent began writing letters to one another in 1872 and continued for 18 years, with 668 letters from Vincent to Theo, many of them with sketches. Theo became Vincent's key source of emotional and financial support as he pursued his artistic development. Theo, who managed an art gallery in Paris and was knowledgeable of trends in modern art, offered Vincent advice. Theo married Johanna Bonger and had a son, whom they named Vincent. Theo died six months after Vincent’s death on 25 January 1891.

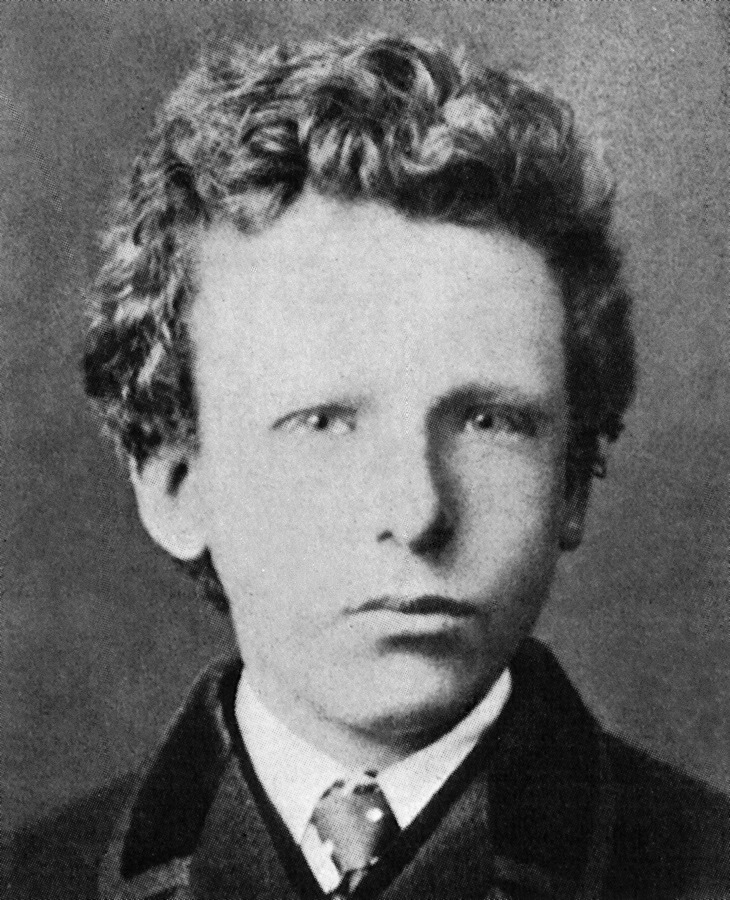
Photograph of Theo van Gogh, 1873

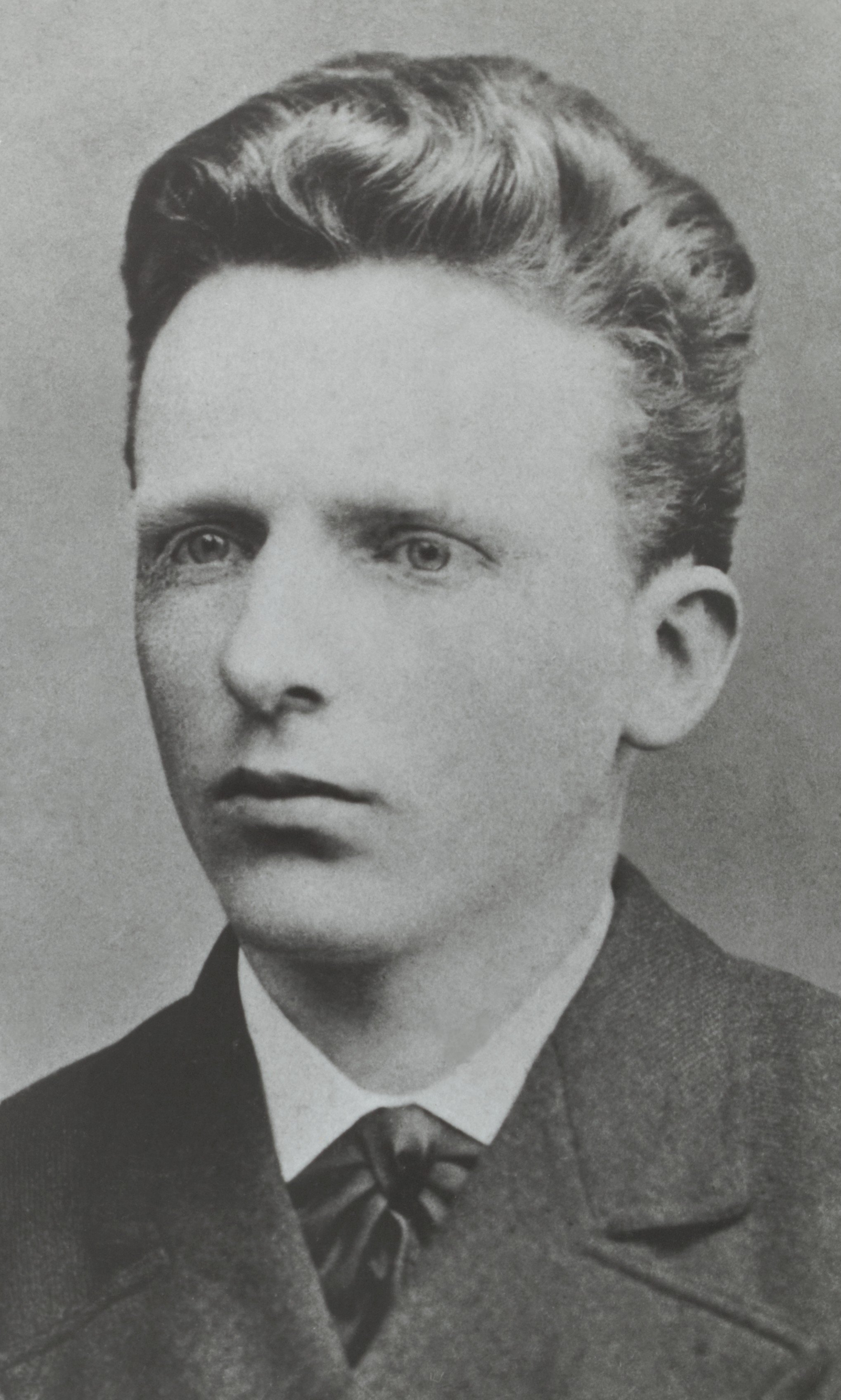
Photograph of Theo van Gogh, 1878

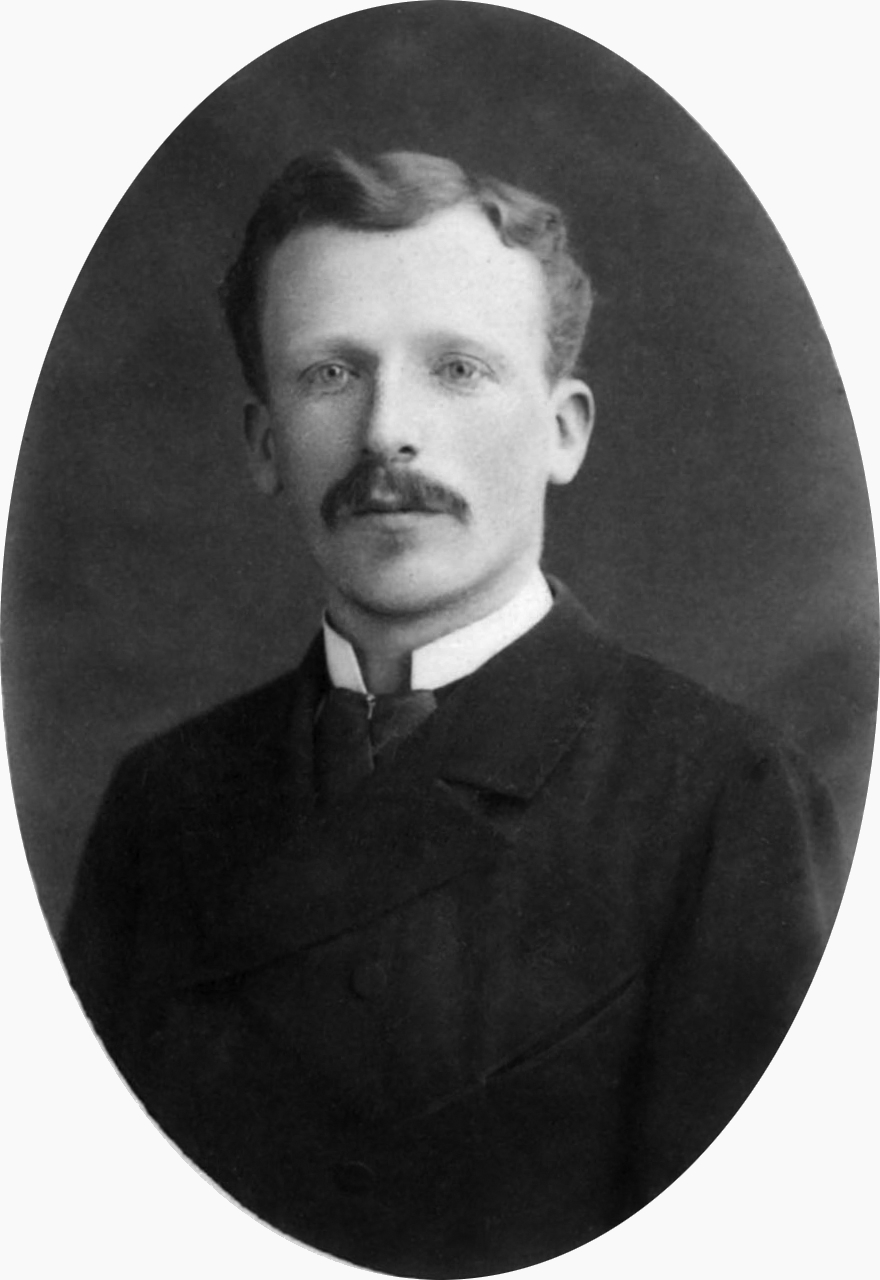
Photograph of Theo van Gogh, 1888

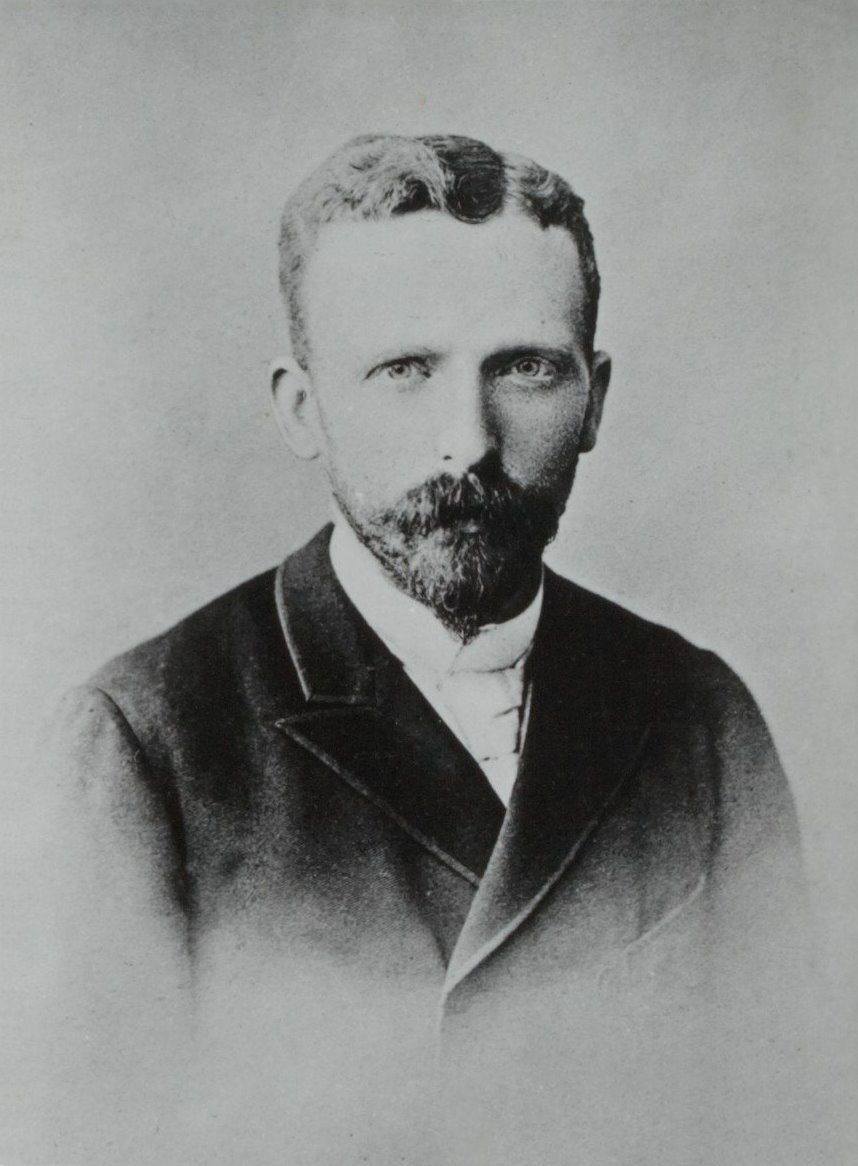
Photograph of Theo van Gogh, 1890

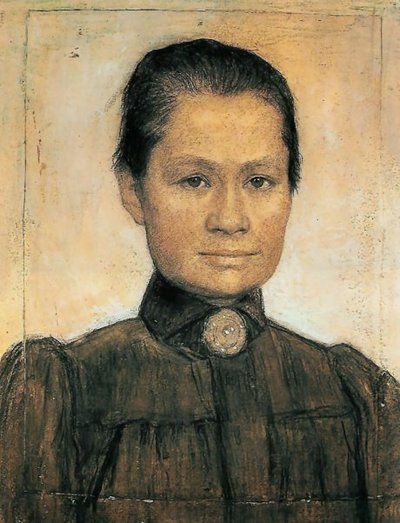
Johan Cohen Gosschalk, Johanna Bonger, 1905

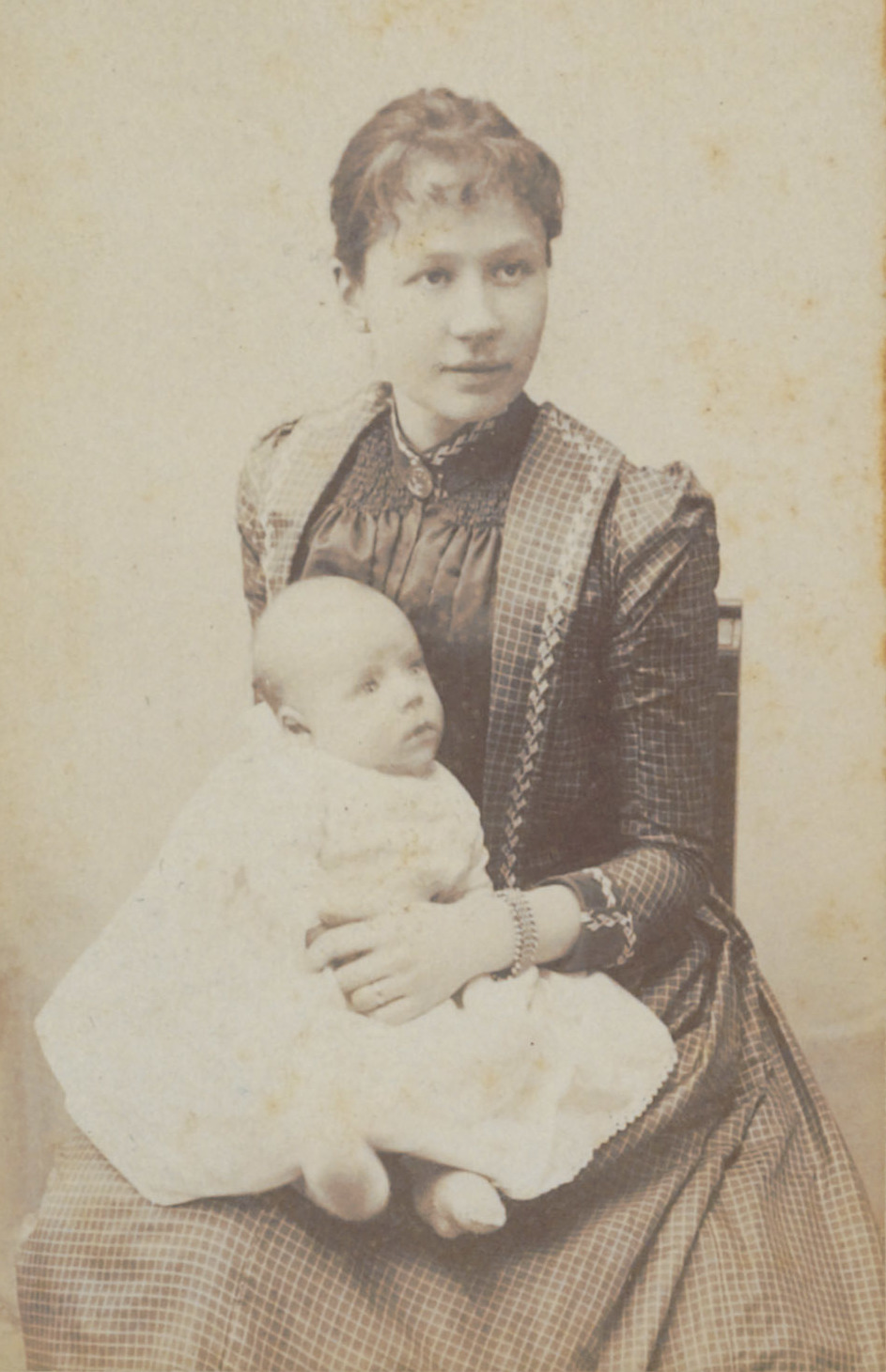
Wife Jo with their son Vincent Willem, 1890

The Van Gogh Museum attributes a painting generally considered a self-portrait to actually be a portrayal of his brother, Theo. In Portrait of Theo van Gogh, (F294), the museum says that the painting was made "to experiment with color, as we can see in the effect of the yellow hat against the blue background, and the range of colors in the jacket, bow-tie and background." Albert J. Lubin, author of "Stranger on the Earth: A Psychological Biography of Vincent van Gogh" claims that Vincent made no portraits of his brother.

Next to this painting is one of Vincent's self-portraits (F296), also made in 1887.

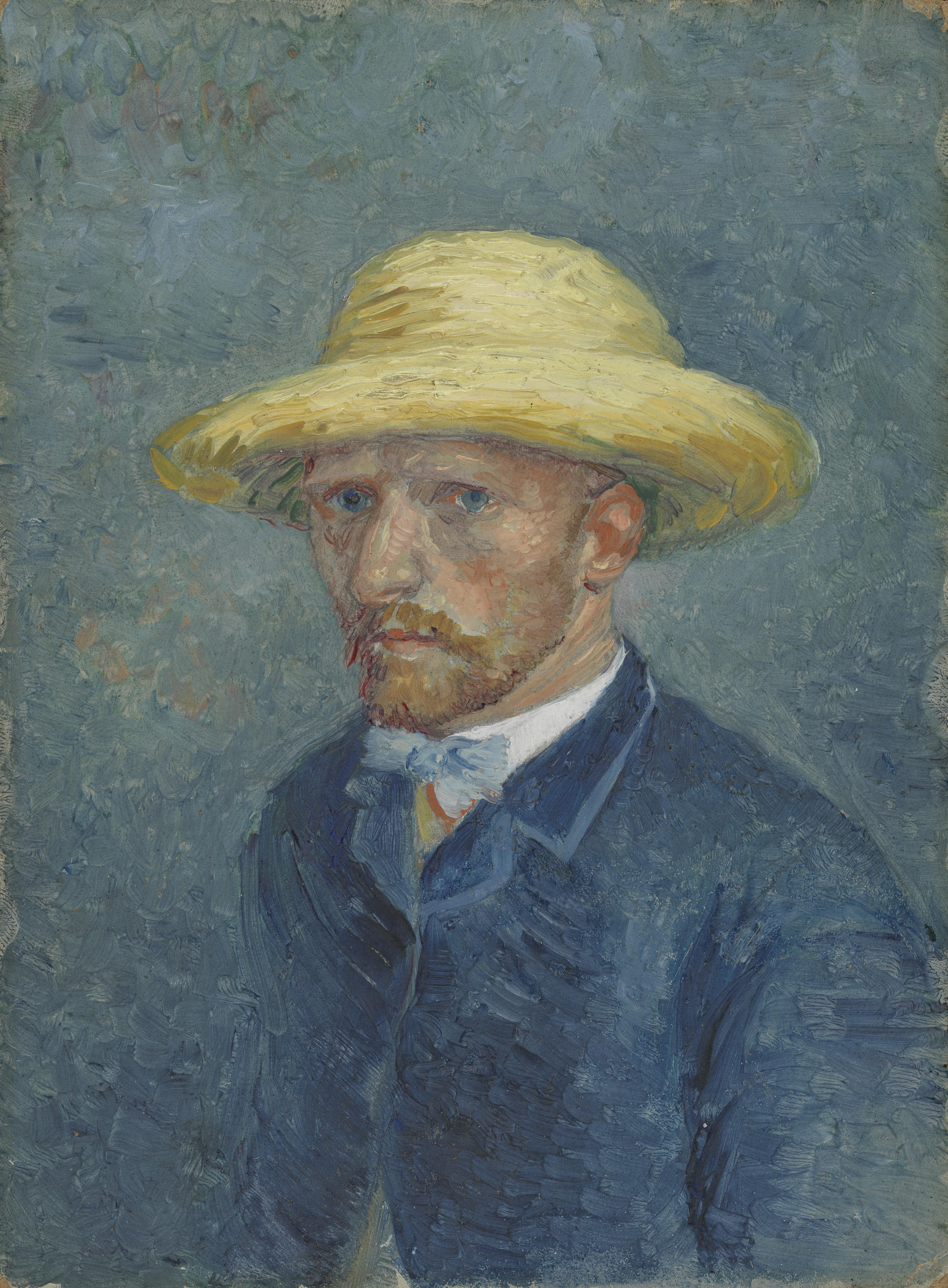
Named by VGM, Portrait of Theo van Gogh, March/April 1887. Van Gogh Museum, Amsterdam (F294)

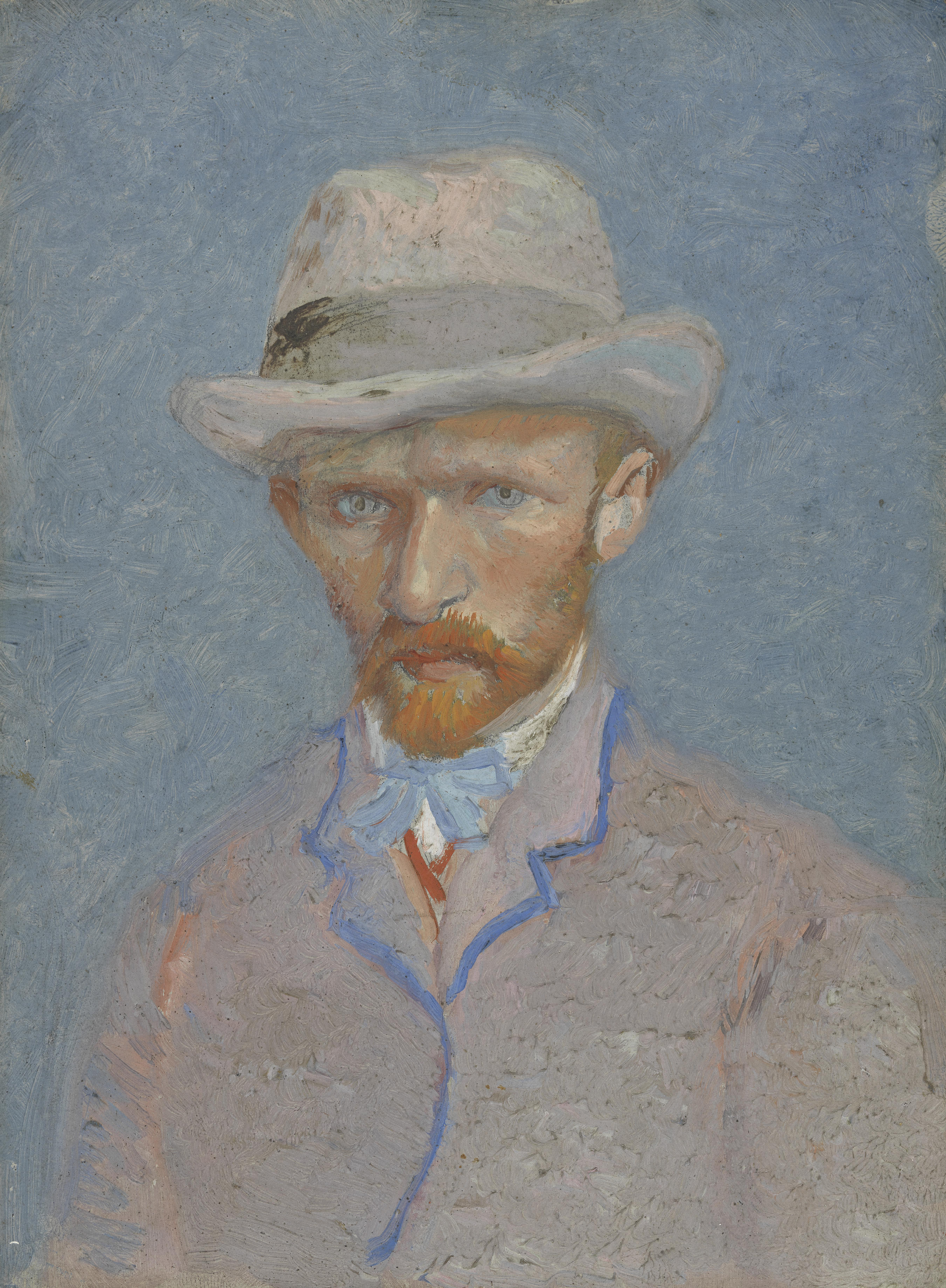
Self-Portrait with Grey Felt Hat, March/April 1887. Oil on pasteboard, 19 × 14 cm. Van Gogh Museum, Amsterdam (F296)

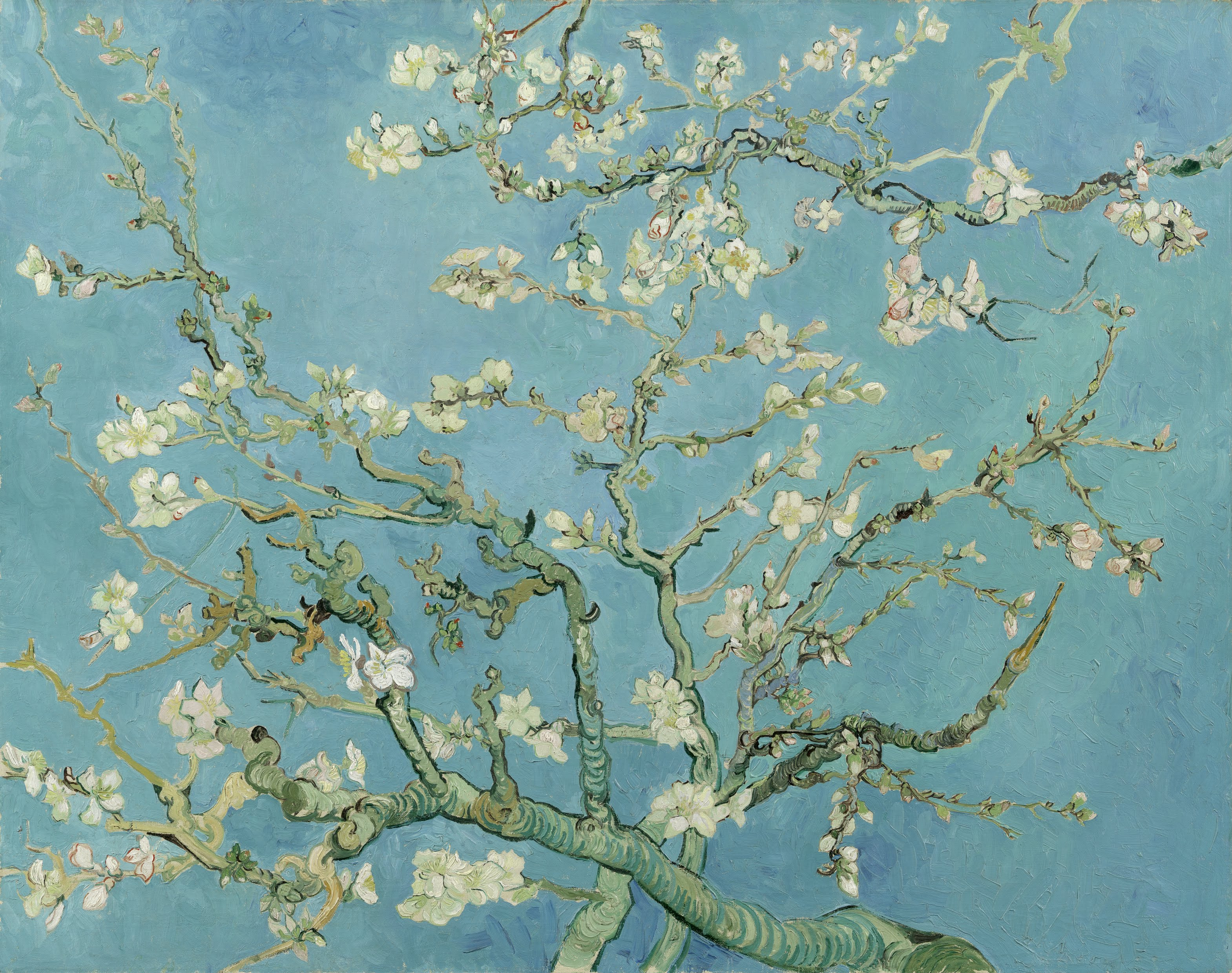
Almond Blossoms, 1890. Van Gogh Museum, Amsterdam (F671)

Vincent made Almond Blossoms for Theo and his wife to celebrate the birth of their son, symbolizing new life in the flowers of the almond tree. Vincent wrote to his mother of the birth of Theo and Jo's baby,

"How glad I was when the news came... I should have greatly preferred him to call the boy after Father, of whom I have been thinking so much these days, instead of after me; but seeing it has now been done, I started right away to make a picture for him, to hang in their bedroom, big branches of white almond blossom against a blue sky."

The bright color is reflective of the paintings made in Arles and the transformational work Vincent had on the still life genre.

=== Wil van Gogh ===
Wil, short for Wilhelmein, was the youngest of Vincent's sisters, born in 1862. She lived with her parents, and after her father died, stayed on with her mother. At times she was a governess, private nurse, social worker and religion teacher. She longed to be a writer and was enthusiastic to hear of news about Paris, its art and cultural happenings. Van Gogh and Wil wrote to each other about literature and modern art in much the same way he did with his brother, Émile Bernard and Paul Gauguin.

Novel Reader is evocative of Vincent's sister. He describes it in a letter to Wil, "'Une Liseuse de Romans', the luxuriant hair very black, a green bodice, the sleeves the color of wine lees, the skirt black, the background all yellow, bookshelves with books. She is holding a yellow book in her hands." The painting was made immediately after Vincent completed a "fantasy" painting of his mother and Wil, Memory of the Garden at Etten.

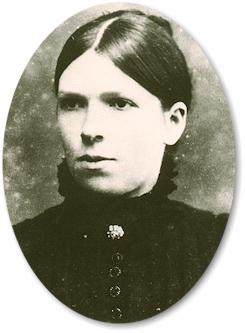
Photograph of Wilhemein "Wil" van Gogh

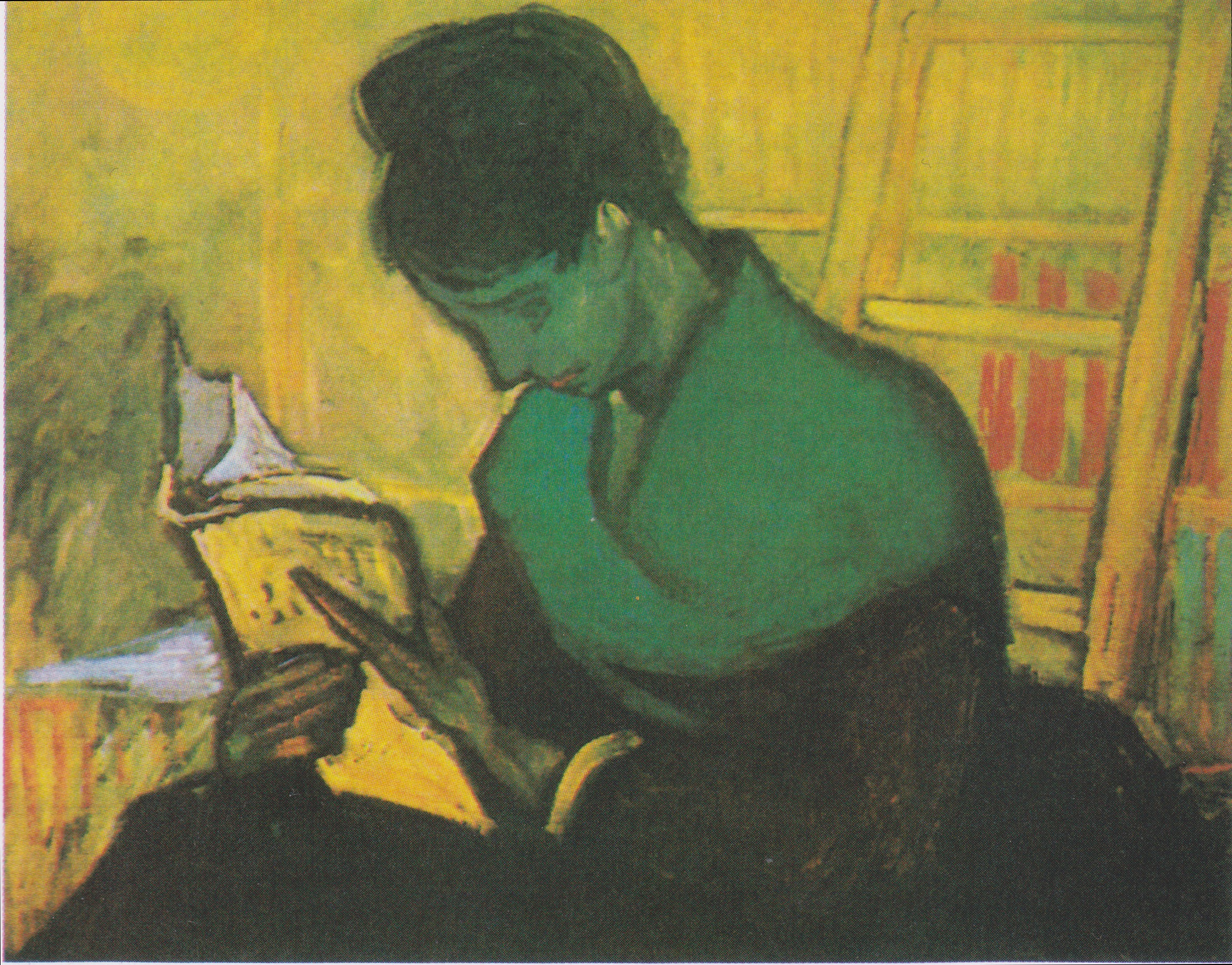
The Novel Reader, 1888, Private collection (F497)

Vincent made a drawing of his sister, "Portrait of Willemina Jacoba ('Willemien') van Gogh" (F849) in July 1881 with pencil and charcoal. It is owned by the Kroller-Muller Museum, Otterlo, Netherlands. The work is also said to be a "possible" portrait of Wil.

In 1888 he gave two paintings to Wil for her birthday. One was Blossoming Almond Branch in a Glass with a Book, which he described to her in a letter as "a little study of a book for you." The second, Still Life with French Novels and a Rose, "on a somewhat larger scale, a flower, with a lot of books with pink, green and bright red bindings – they were my set of seven Parisian novels."

During the summer of 1889, honoring his sister Wil's request, Vincent made several smaller versions of Wheat Field with Cypresses.

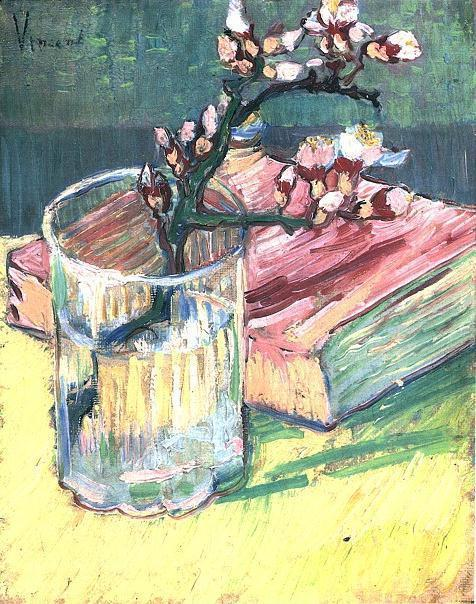
Blossoming Almond Branch in a Glass with a Book, 1888, Private collection (F393)

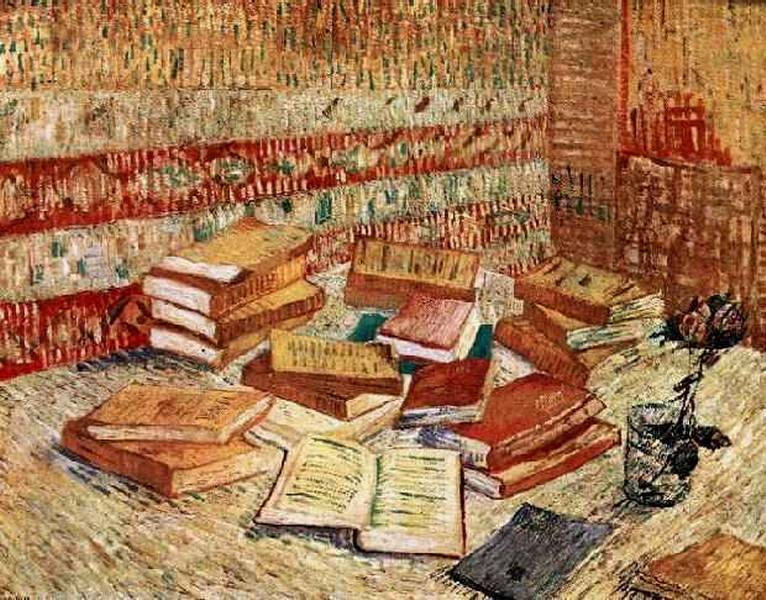
Still Life with Piles of French Novels and a Glass with a Rose (Romans Parisiens), 1887, Private Collection, Switzerland (F359)

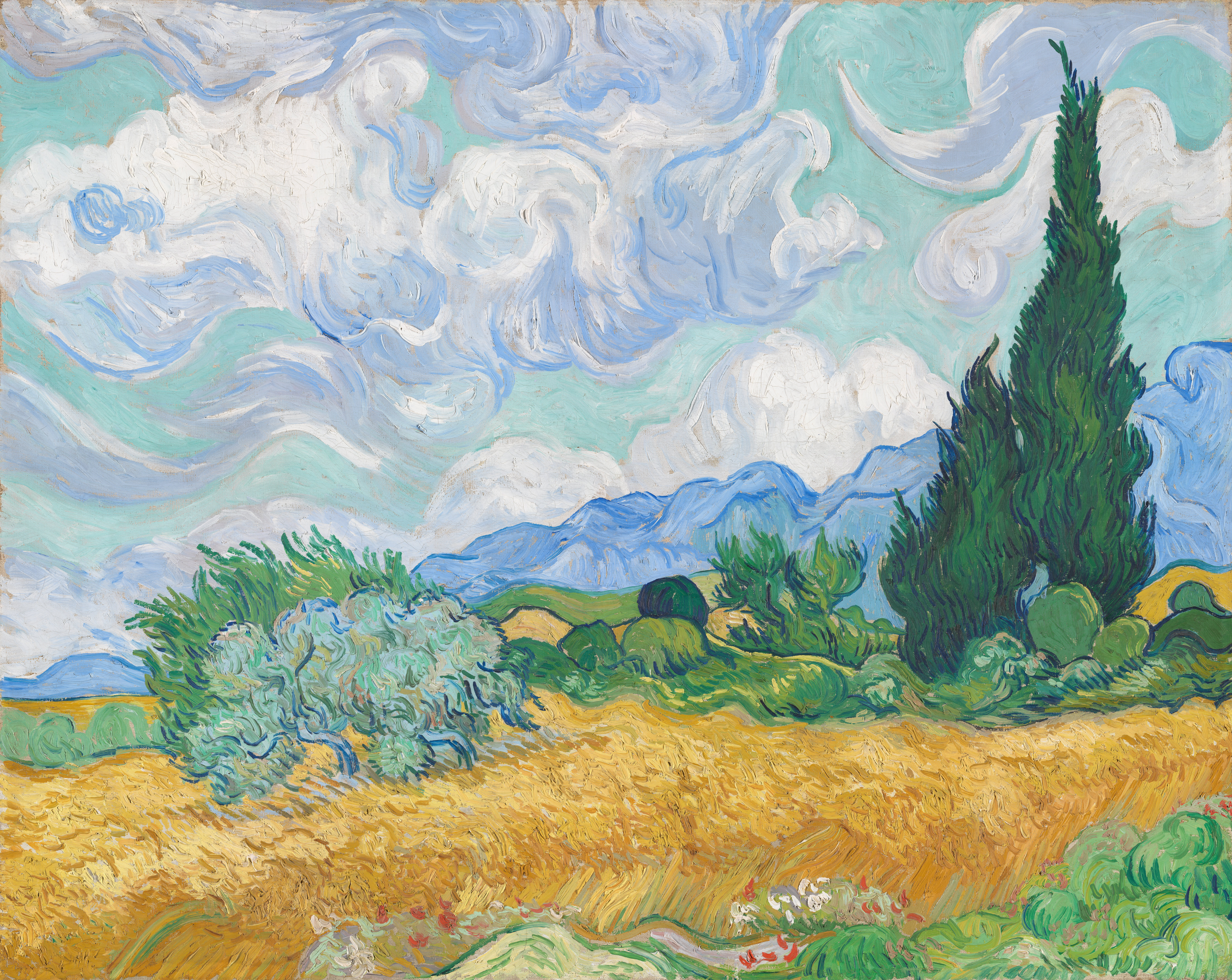
Wheat Field with Cypresses, (1889), National Gallery, London (F615)

=== Anna, Elizabeth, and Cornelius ===
Vincent did not have a close relationship with Elizabeth (Lies) or his youngest brother Cornelius (Cor).

Anna lived with Vincent in London for a period in 1874–5. Their initially warm relationship became strained; in April 1875, Anna wrote about Vincent's behaviour to Theo: "I believe that he has illusions about people and judges people before he knows them, and then when he finds out what they're really like and they don't live up to the opinion he formed of them prematurely, he's so disappointed that he throws them away like a bouquet of wilted flowers, without looking to see whether or not there are some among those wilted flowers which, when handled with care, are not quite rubbish yet." She married Joan Marius van Houten in August 1878. Vincent attended the wedding, but relations with his sister remained cool; Anna complained about his aloofness and characterized him as a "wooden lion" After their father's death in 1885 the two became estranged.

The youngest Van Gogh sibling, Cor, left the Netherlands for South Africa during the Second Boer War (1899–1902). In Pretoria, he was employed to make technical drawings for the Netherlands-South African Railway Company (Nederlandsh-Zuid-Afrikaansche Spoorweg Maatschappij). In Pretoria he married Anna Eva Catherina Fuchs, a German-born Roman Catholic, in February 1898. His wife abandoned the marriage eight months later, taking their possessions. Following that debacle, Cor joined a special "Foreigners Battalion" to fight the British. Cor and his fellow volunteers fared badly in combat. He was admitted to a Red Cross hospital with a fever. The ill-supplied hospital lacked Dutch physicians and nurses, who had just been evacuated. Cor was left in possession of his pistol when hospitalized. On 12 April 1900 he shot himself in his hospital bed, perhaps accidentally. His mother was under the impression that he had died in combat.

=== Anton Mauve ===
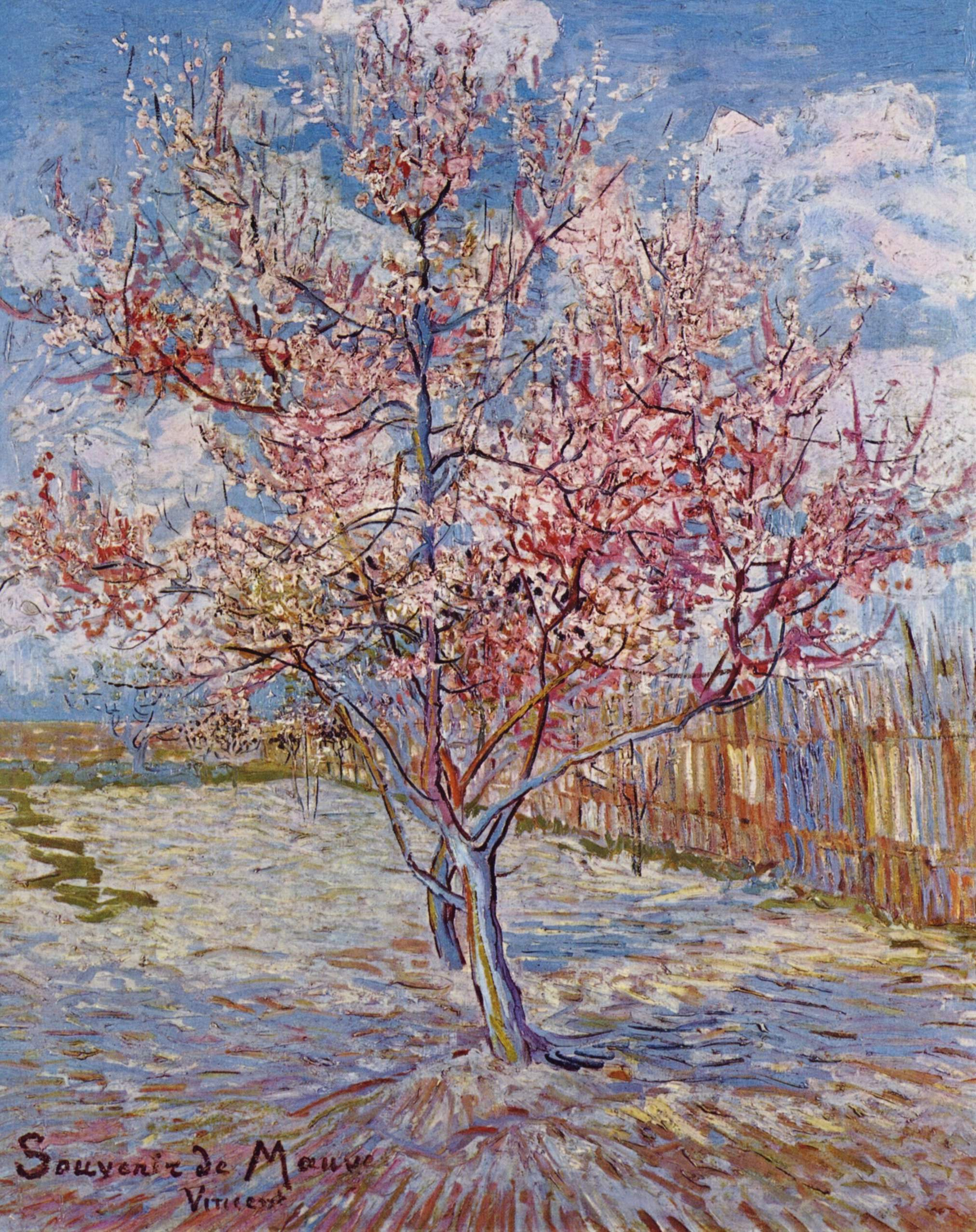
Souvenir de Mauve (circa 30 March 1888), oil on canvas, Kröller-Müller Museum

Anton Mauve was married to Vincent's cousin Ariëtte (Jet) Sophia Jeannette Carbentus and was a major influence on the artist. He is mentioned directly in 152 of Vincent's surviving letters. Vincent spent three weeks at Mauve's studio at the end of 1881 and during that time he made his first experiments in painting under Mauve's tutelage, first in oils and then early the next year in watercolour (he had earlier concentrated on drawing). Mauve continued to encourage him and lent him money to rent and furnish a studio but later grew cold towards him and did not return a number of letters.

In a letter to his brother Theo dated 7 May 1882, Vincent describes "a very regrettable conversation" in which Mauve told him their association was "over and done with" adding by way of explanation that Van Gogh had a vicious character. Vincent continued his letter by expressing his sorrow and then defiantly launches into a defense of his relationship with Clasina (Sien) Maria Hoornik, a pregnant prostitute he had befriended.

== Vicarage and church ==
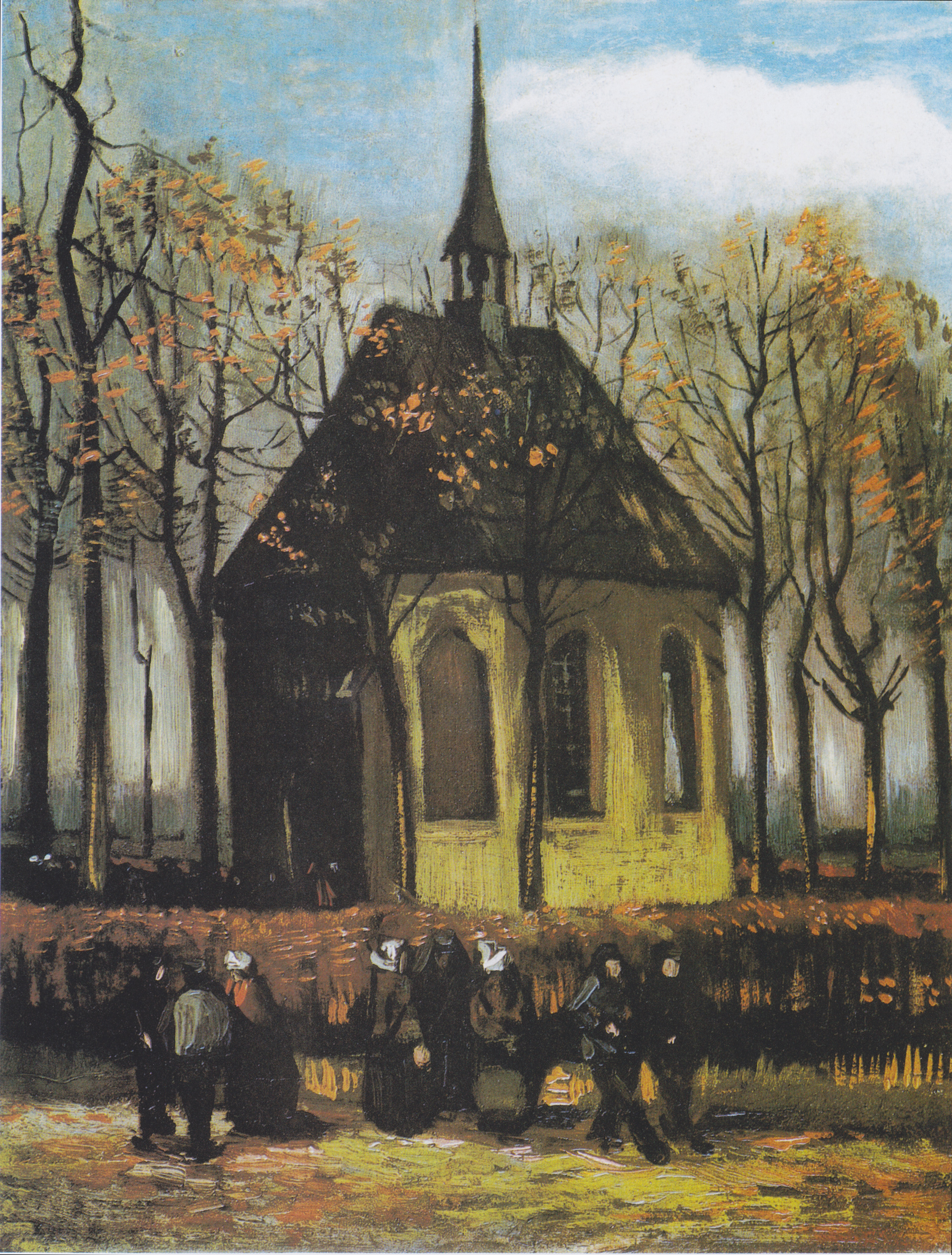
Congregation Leaving the Reformed Church in Nuenen, 1884, Van Gogh Museum, Amsterdam (F25)

In 1882 Vincent's father became pastor in Nuenen situated in the North Brabant province of the Netherlands. Having been in Drenthe for several months, Vincent came to live with his parents in December 1883 and stayed there until May 1885. The laundry room at the back of the house was turned into a studio for him. Theo's father wrote to him: "We do not think it’s really suitable, but we have had a proper stove installed... I wanted to put in a large window as well, but he prefers not to have one."

A simple two-story stone building, the parsonage sat on the main street of Nuenen. The second story provided Vincent beautiful views, including a church tower in the distance. The laundry room became his studio. Vincent recorded the changing seasons in his paintings of the garden, which was enclosed by a high stone wall and included a duck pond with a boat dock, paths and hedges, flower and vegetable garden plots and an orchard.

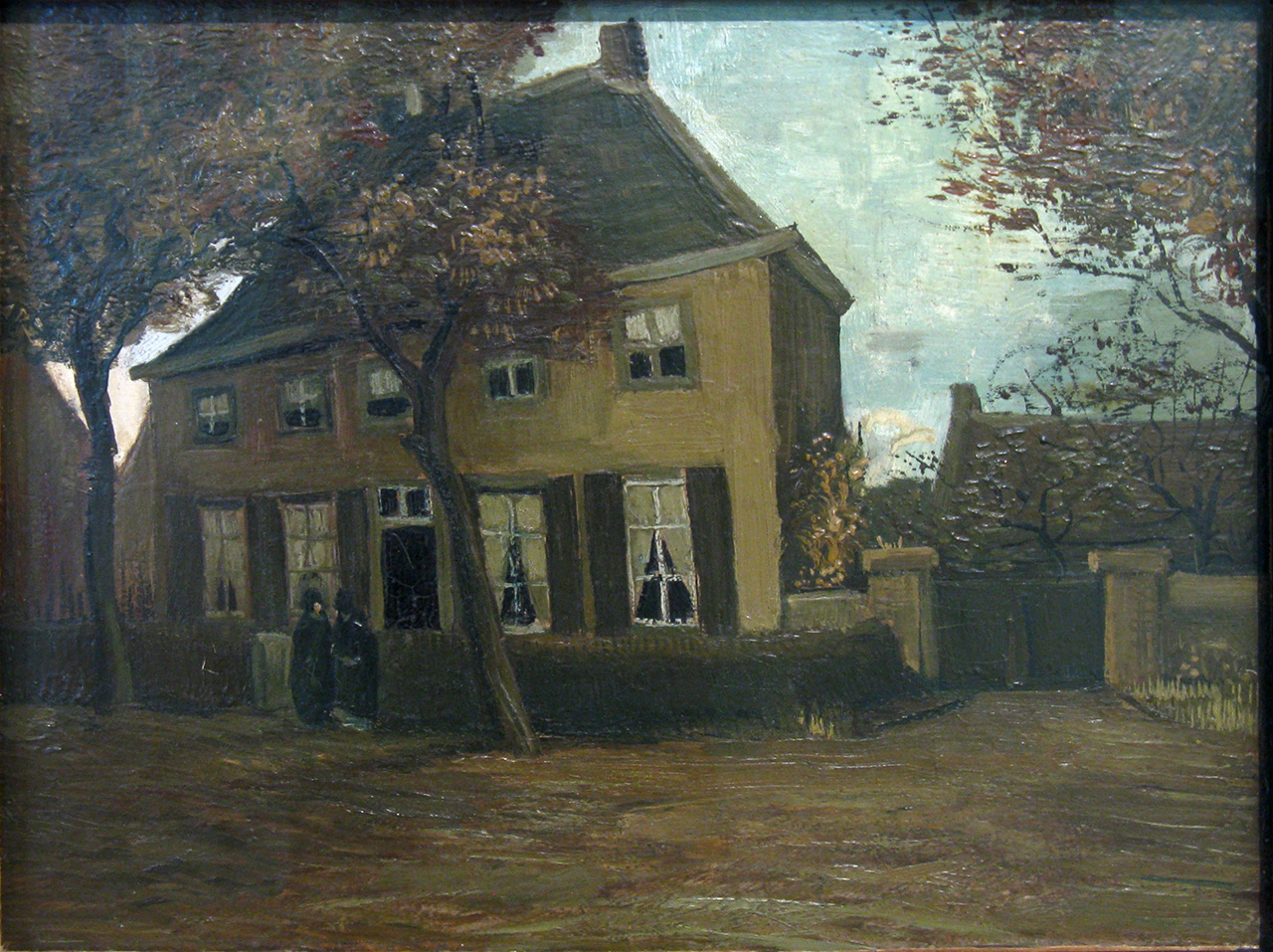
The Vicarage at Nuenen, 1885, Van Gogh Museum, Amsterdam (F182)

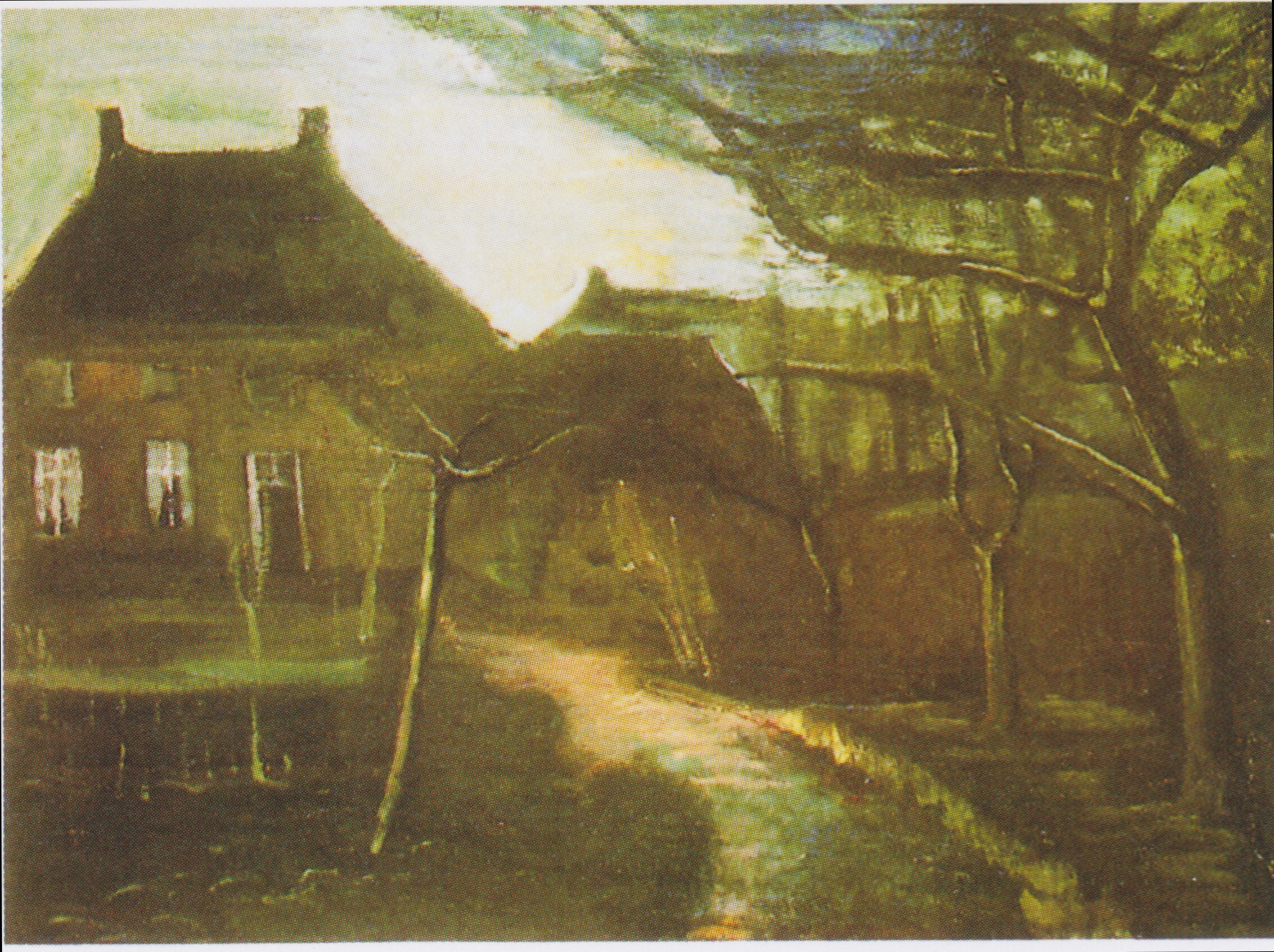
The Vicarage at Nuenen in the Moonlight, November 1885, Private collection (F183)

Congregation Leaving the Reformed Church in Nuenen (F25) was made early 1884 for his parents, his father the pastor of the church since 1882. Vincent's mother, Anna van Gogh, was healing from a broken thighbone. Vincent wrote to his brother, "Taking her difficult situation into consideration, I am glad to say Mother's spirits are very even and bright. And she is amused by trifles. The other day I painted for her a little church with the hedge and the trees." The letter included a sketch with one person in front of the church, a peasant with a spade. X-rays of the painting indicate that Vincent later added church members and autumn leaves to the previously bare trees, which made the work more colorful. The changes were not likely made before the fall of 1885. Vincent may have added the woman in mourning and congregation members for his mother as a memorial for his father's death. The painting was stolen from the Van Gogh Museum on 7 December 2002. The painting was recovered in Naples, Italy in September 2016.

The Rectory Garden in Nuenen in the Snow (F194) depicts a worker shoveling a path in the snow of the Vincent's garden. The winter scene of bare-branched trees and gloomy sky hints of the preceding fall by a few remaining red leaves. Vincent wrote to Theo: "The life and death of peasants remain forever the same, withering regularly, like the grass and flowers growing in that churchyard." The Norton Simon Museum reports that X-ray of the painting shows that underneath this painting is a painting of a woman at her spinning wheel.

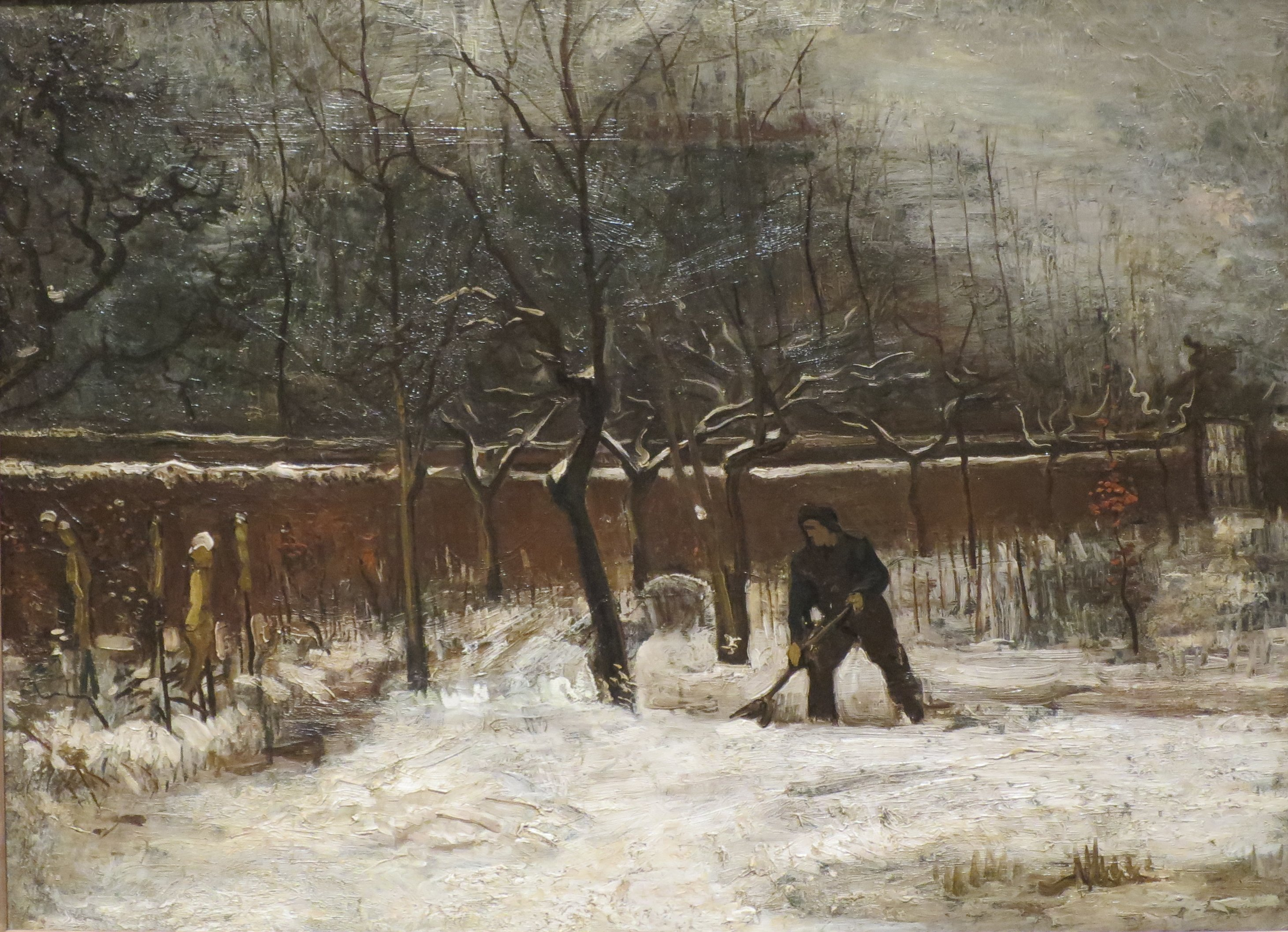
The Rectory Garden in Nuenen in the Snow, January 1885, Norton Simon Museum, Pasadena (F194)

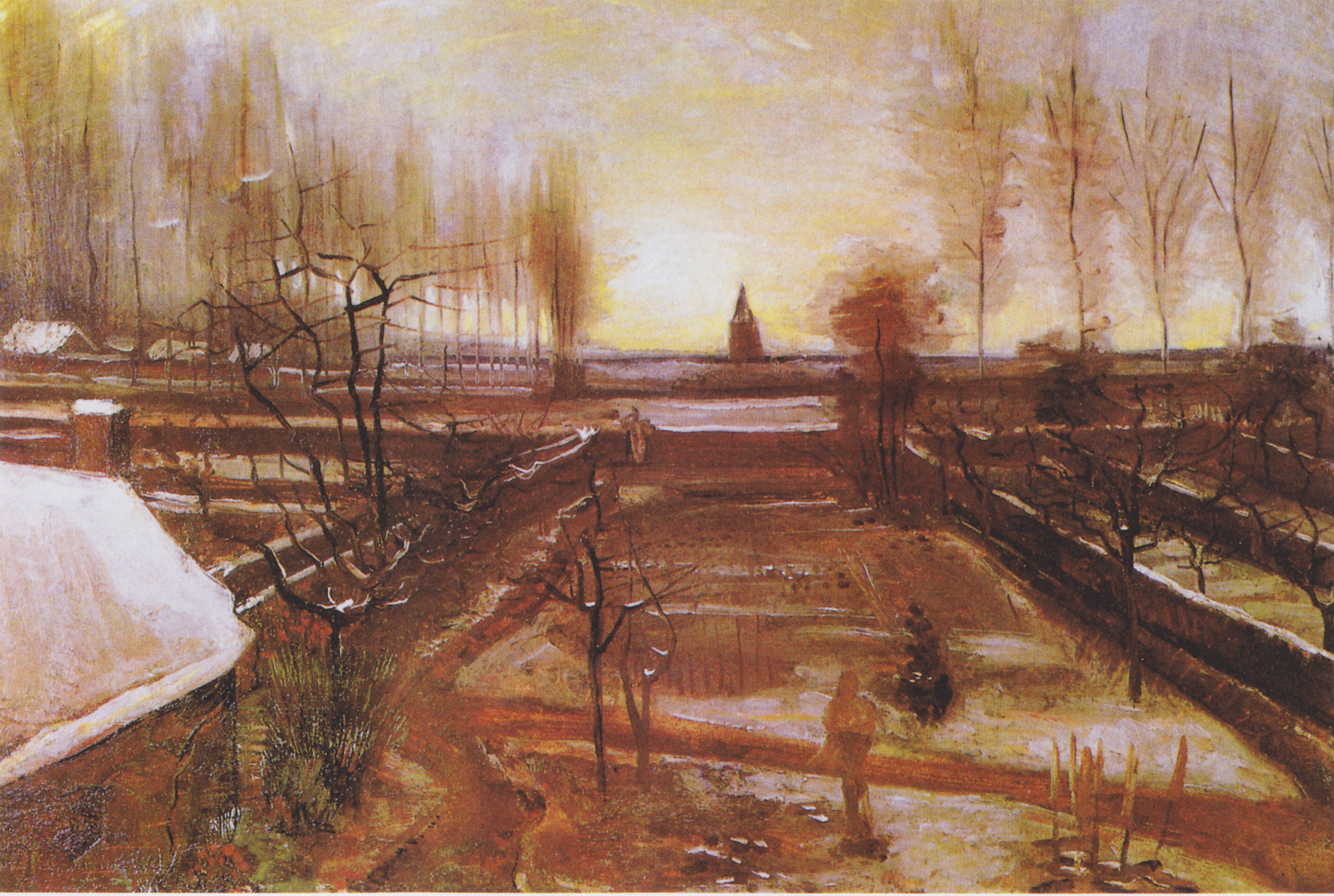
The Rectory Garden in Nuenen in the Snow, January 1885, Armand Hammer Museum of Art, Los Angeles (F67)

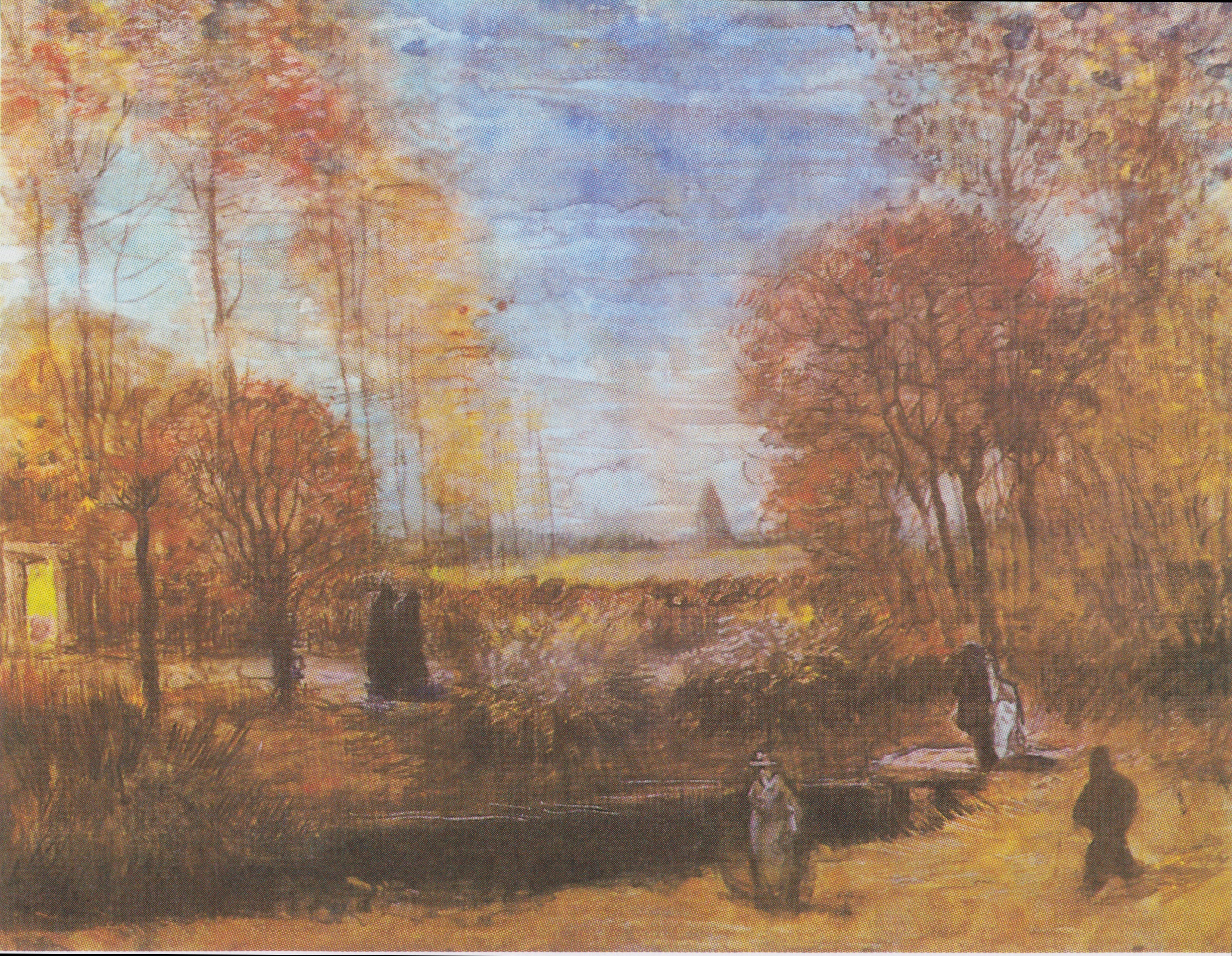
The Parsonage Garden at Nuenen with Pond and Figures, watercolor, November 1885, Private collection (F1234)

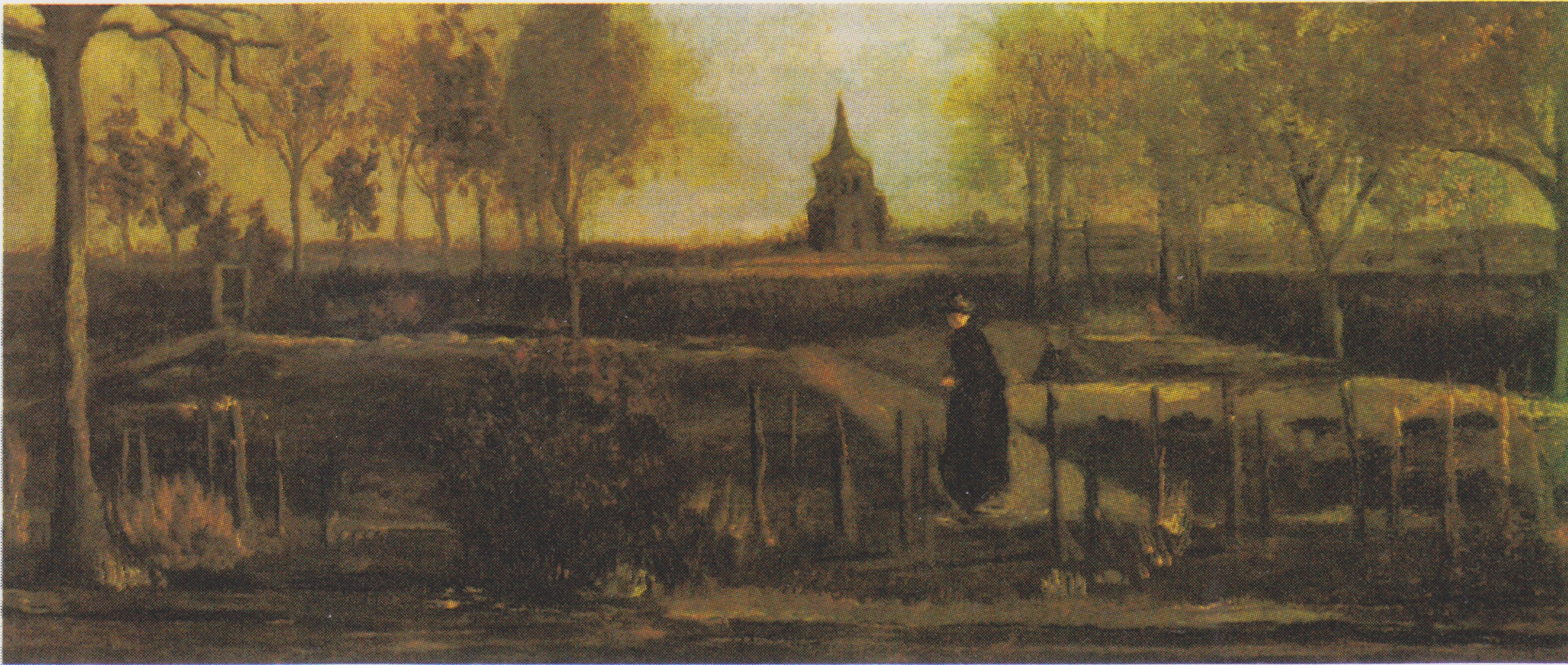
The Parsonage Garden at Nuenen, May 1884, Groninger Museum (F185)

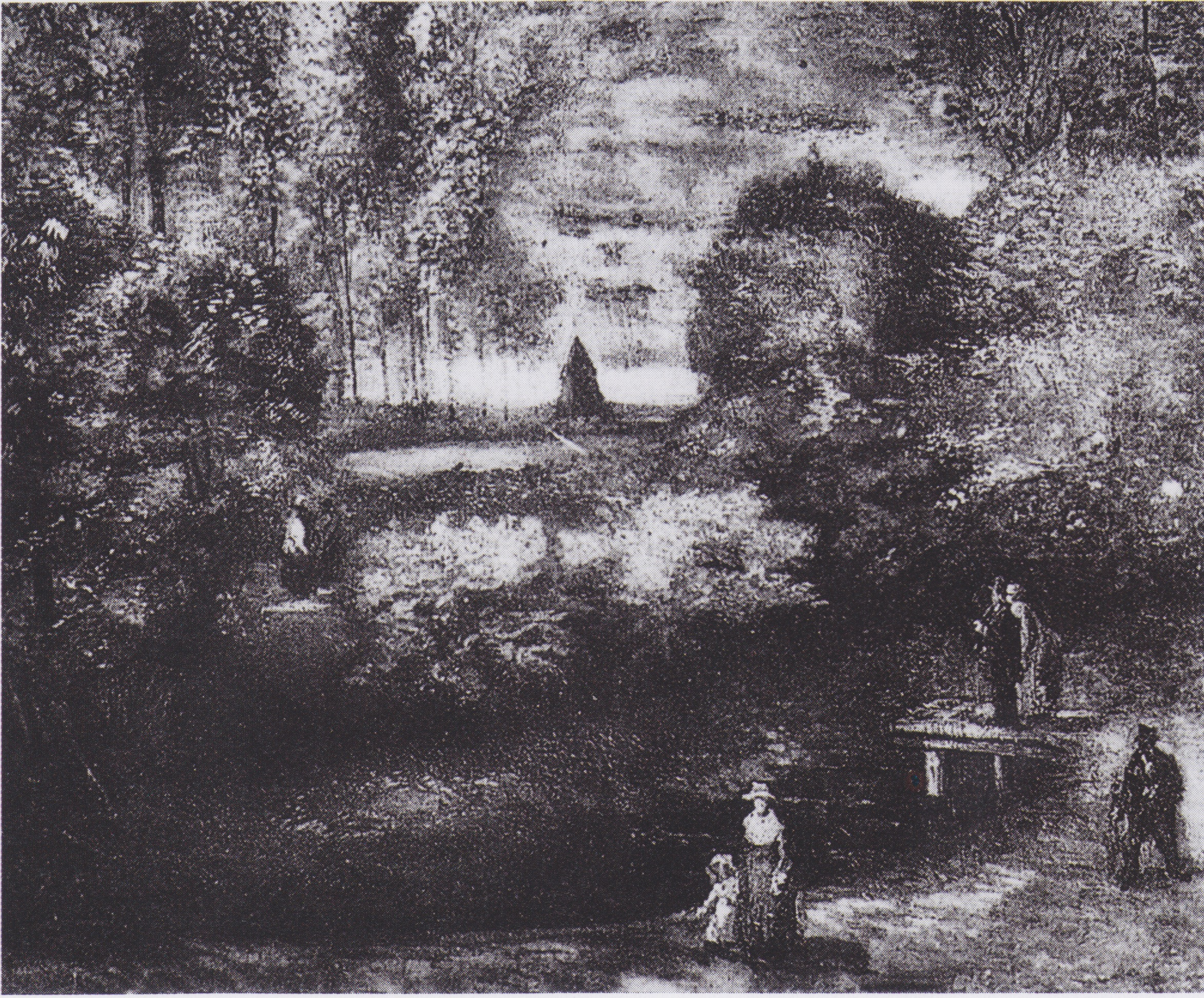
The Parsonage Garden at Nuenen with Pond and Figures, 1885, Destroyed by fire in World War Two, Rotterdam (F124)

== See also ==
- List of works by Vincent van Gogh
