= Cultural depictions of Vincent van Gogh =

Vincent van Gogh depicted in culture

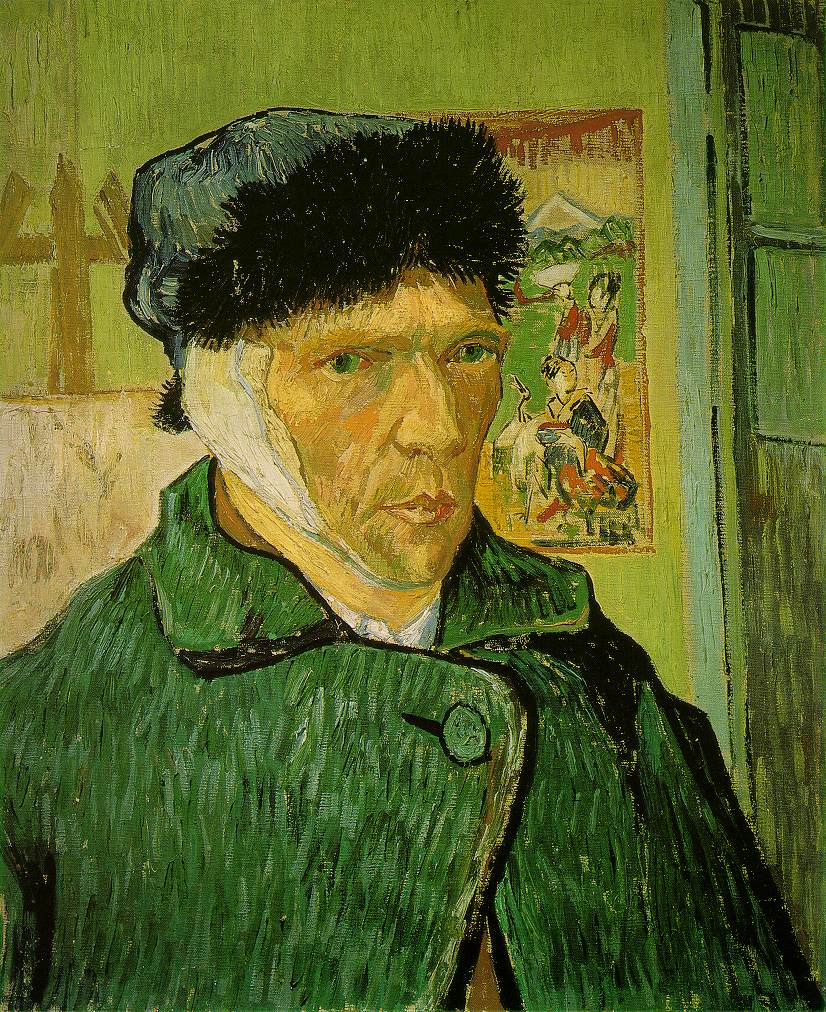
Self-portrait with Bandaged Ear, Easel and Japanese Print, January 1889 Oil on canvas, 60 × 49 cm Courtauld Institute Galleries, London (F527)

This is a list that shows references made to the life and work of Dutch artist Vincent van Gogh (1853–1890) in culture.

== Literature ==
- Paul Gauguin writes about van Gogh in his book Avant et après (Before and After) (1903).
- The artist's life forms the basis for Irving Stone's 1934 biographical novel Lust for Life.
- "Starry Night," a poem written by Tupac Shakur, is a dedication to Van Gogh and his work.
- Letters to Theo, a selection of Vincent's letters to his brother, became popular in several languages during the 1950s.
- The Flemish writer and visual artist Louis Paul Boon based his 1944 novel Abel Gholaerts on the life of Van Gogh, although he moved the story to Flanders.
- Antonin Artaud wrote a study Van Gogh le suicidé de la société (Van Gogh, The Man Suicided by Society) in 1947, after visiting an exhibition of the painter's works.
- Paul Celan mentions Van Gogh's ear in his poem Mächte, Gewalten (Powers, Dominions).
- Woody Allen wrote a parody of Vincent's letters to Theo in the short story, "If the Impressionists Had Been Dentists", which is included in Allen's 1975 book Without Feathers.
- Theun de Vries wrote a novel, Vincent in Den Haag (Vincent in The Hague), which takes place between 1881 and 1883.
- Ivan Diviš wrote a poem, "Goghova milá" ("Gogh's Lover"), published in his book Rozpleť si vlasy (Unplait Your Hair, 1961).
- Charles Bukowski wrote a poem on Van Gogh called "Working Out".
- The Dutch-Northern Irish writer Remco van Straten published "Hastur's Canvas", framing Vincent van Gogh's time in France in the context of Lovecraftian horror.
- R.w. Meek, Pulitzer Prize Nominee 2024, depicts Vincent van Gogh in his novel, The Dream Collector, Book II, Sabrine & Vincent van Gogh and offers reasons for his suicide.
- In the 2025 middle grade novel Starry, Starry Heist by Karen Briner, a young boy travels back in time to meet Van Gogh and save The Starry Night from being “existinguished”—wiped from all existence.

== Music ==
=== Classical ===
- Nevit Kodallı: Van Gogh, Turkish opera (1956)
- Gloria Coates: Homage to Van Gogh (1993/94)
- Grigori Frid: Letters of van Gogh, mono-opera in two parts for baritone - clarinet, percussion, piano, strings op. 69 (1975) – small Version for baritone - clarinet, piano and violoncello
- Bertold Hummel: Eight fragments from letters of Vincent van Gogh for baritone and string quartet op. 84 (1985)
- Einojuhani Rautavaara: Vincent, opera in three acts (1986–1987). This was based on several events in Van Gogh's life; he later used some of the same themes in his 6th symphony, Vincentiana.
- Einojuhani Rautavaara: Vincentiana, symphony N° 6 (1992) - movements: I Tähtiyö (Starry night) II Varikset (The crows) III Saint-Rémy IV Apotheosis
- Henri Dutilleux: Correspondances for soprano and orchestra (2002–2004) - movements: I. Danse cosmique (P. Mukherjee) II. A Slava et Galina... (A. Solschenizyn) III. Gong (R. M. Rilke) IV. Gong II (R. M. Rilke) V. De Vincent à Théo... (V. van Gogh)
- Henri Dutilleux, Timbres, espace, mouvement (Timbre, space, movement) is a work for orchestra composed, 1978.

=== Popular ===
Vincent van Gogh, The Starry Night, 1889, Museum of Modern Art, New York, (F612)

- In 1971, singer Don McLean wrote the song "Vincent" in honor of Van Gogh; also known by its opening words, "Starry Starry Night," the song refers to the painting
- In 2006, Hong Kong singer-songwriter Ivana Wong composed a song called "Painting's Meaning" (Chinese: 畫意) in memory of van Gogh.
- Bandits of the Acoustic Revolution (and later frontman Tomas Kalnoky's other band Streetlight Manifesto) mention van Gogh in their song "Heres to Life": "Vincent Van Gogh why do you weep?/ You were on your way to heaven but the road was steep./ Who was there to break your fall,/ we're guilty one and all."
- The title track for Joni Mitchell's album Turbulent Indigo references Van Gogh's madness. The album cover is a take on Van Gogh's Self-Portrait with Bandaged Ear.
- A Spanish Group is named La Oreja de Van Gogh (Van Gogh's Ear).
- The Vigilantes of Love released a song titled "Skin", which is about Van Gogh.
- Brian Eno and John Cale recorded "Spinning Away" on their album Wrong Way Up (1990). A sample lyric states, "One by one, all the stars appear/As the great winds of the planet spiral in/Spinning away, like the night sky at Arles".
- In 2015, Malaysian Sound Artist Goh Lee Kwang composed an electronic music composition called "Bandaged Ear" dedicated to van Gogh.
- Matthew Perryman Jones' album "Land of the Living" includes the song "O Theo", in which the lyrics imagine that Vincent is writing about his life to his brother Theo, echoing how the real Vincent wrote many vivid letters to Theo.

== Film and television ==
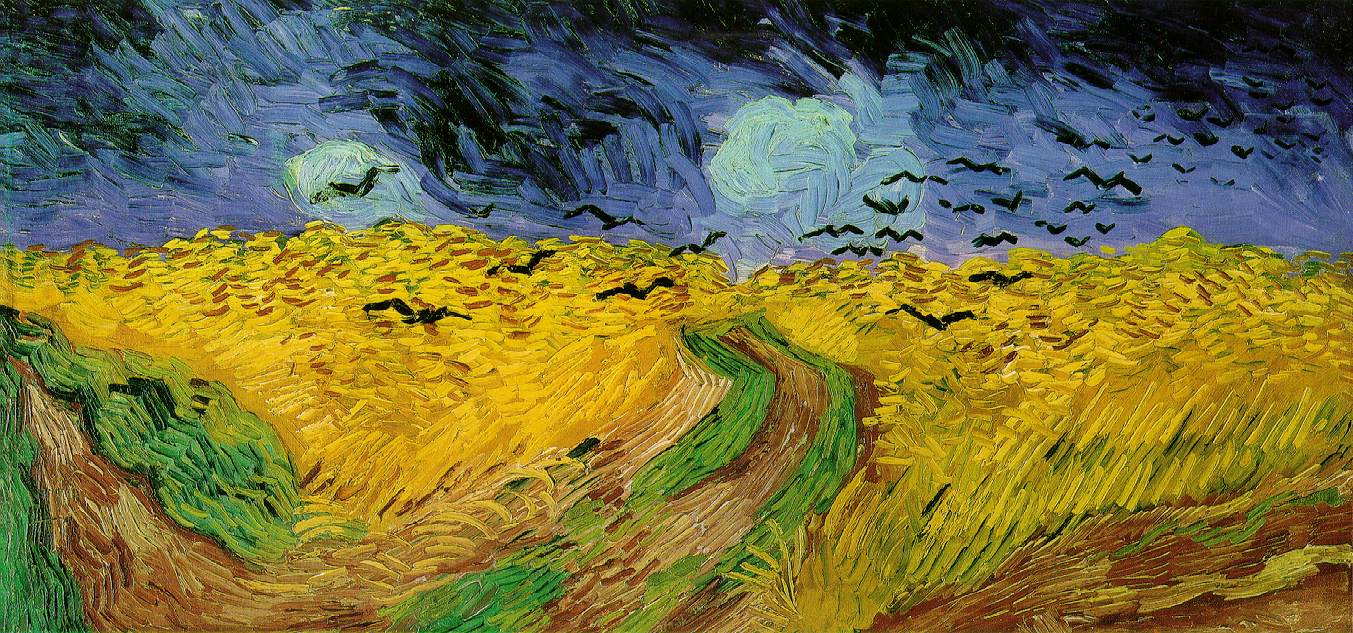
Wheatfield with Crows, 1890, Van Gogh Museum, Amsterdam

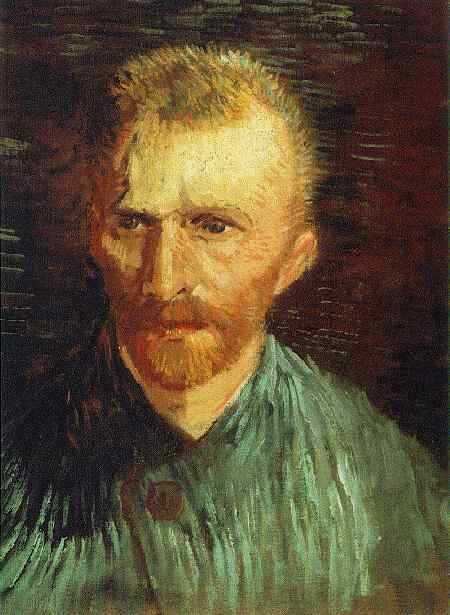
Vincent van Gogh, Self-Portrait, Summer 1887, Paris Van Gogh Museum, Amsterdam (F77v)

- Lust for Life, a 1934 novel by Irving Stone, was adapted into a film of the same name. It was directed by Vincente Minnelli and George Cukor and produced by John Houseman. The 1956 film starred Kirk Douglas as Vincent van Gogh and Anthony Quinn as Paul Gauguin. The film was nominated for four Academy Awards, including best actor and best supporting actor, for which Anthony Quinn won.
- In 1948, Alain Resnais made the documentary Van Gogh. Resnais' black-and-white film featured only Van Gogh's canvases. According to art and film historian John Walker, "the artist's personal crisis was inscribed in the images on screen by means of accelerated montage".
- Mai Zetterling and David Hughes made the 1972 documentary-drama Vincent the Dutchman, with Michael Gough in the title role, following in Van Gogh's footsteps and re-visiting the actual locations where he lived and died.
- Australian director Paul Cox made a film called Vincent (also known as Vincent: The Life and Death of Vincent Van Gogh) in 1987, consisting entirely of readings of passages from Vincent's letters (read by John Hurt), and accompanied by scenes of the actual locations where he painted. The entire film is claimed to be seen through Van Gogh's own eyes, including his final suicide.
- Director Alexander Barnett The Eyes of Van Gogh, a film about the 12 months Van Gogh spent in an asylum at St. Remy. web site blog
- Abraham Ségal produced a 70-minute color documentary Van Gogh ou la Revanche Ambiguë (Van Gogh or the Double-edged Triumph) in 1989. This documentary examines the "cult" and "myth" of Van Gogh. It is described as an "intelligent account" of the phenomenon, including scenes of the New York auction of Van Gogh's Irises, of 100-year celebrations in Arles, St. Rémy, Auvers and Amsterdam, as well as interviews with people in Arles, a medical expert, Kirk Douglas, Johan Van Gogh, writers and artists "obsessed" with the artist.
- The IMAX film Van Gogh, een kleurrijk portret (Van Gogh, a colorful portrait) was released 1989, the same year the film Vincent van Gogh, een zaaier in Etten (Vincent van Gogh, a sower in Etten) came into circulation, the director was Vincent Oudendijk.
- Japanese filmmaker Akira Kurosawa paid homage to Van Gogh in the 1990 film Dreams. The film was based upon Kurosawa's own dreams and included a vignette titled "Crows" based on the painting Wheat Field with Crows, which starred the American director Martin Scorsese as Van Gogh.
- Michael Rubbo directed the 1990 family film Vincent and Me.
- Director Robert Altman portrayed the life story of Vincent van Gogh (Tim Roth) and of his brother Theo van Gogh (Paul Rhys) in the film Vincent & Theo (1990).
- Maurice Pialat's Van Gogh (1991) starred Jacques Dutronc in the title role. The film earned a record twelve César nominations and Dutronc won the award for best actor.
- Clone High (2003 and 2023–2024) has a character based on Van Gogh, who appeared throughout the show as a background character.
- Simon Schama's Power of Art, a 2006 documentary, starred Andy Serkis as Van Gogh in episode 6.
- The first fully hand-painted feature film, Loving Vincent, was released in 2017. This animated biopic recounts the life of Van Gogh, with each frame consisting of an oil painting executed in Van Gogh's style and a plot based on his letters. It was awarded a European Film Award for Best Animated Feature and also earned an Oscar nomination in 2018.
- The Yellow House. Van Gogh and Gauguin in Arles.
- In 2010, Benedict Cumberbatch portrayed Van Gogh in the Andrew Hutton bio-documentary Van Gogh: Painted with Words, with Jamie Parker as his brother Theo, showing the correspondence between the two brothers and the circumstances at the moments the letters were written. It is based on the real letters of Vincent and Theo, and updated by Andrew Hutton and Alan Yentob.
- A 2010 episode of Doctor Who titled "Vincent and the Doctor" featured Tony Curran as the artist. He reprised his role at the beginning of "The Pandorica Opens".
- In 2013, Dutch actor Barry Atsma starred as Vincent in a Dutch miniseries Van Gogh: een huis voor Vincent (literally: Van Gogh: a house for Vincent; international name The Van Gogh Legacy). The dramatized story of Vincent is told through the eyes of his only surviving nephew Vincent Willem (nl), played by Jeroen Krabbé. The series has been sold to broadcasting corporations in Germany, Italy and South Korea.
- In the 2018 film At Eternity's Gate actor Willem Dafoe portrays Van Gogh in the final years of his life, leading up to a dramatisation of the theory that the painter's death was a result of manslaughter, rather than suicide.

== Theatre ==
- In the mid-1970s, Leonard Nimoy starred in a one-man play called Vincent that he'd adapted from the play Van Gogh by Phillip Stephens. A performance was televised in 1981, and a DVD based on the video recording was released in 2006. The adapted version was published in 1984.

== Video games ==
- In 2001's Luigi's Mansion, there is a ghost named Vincent Van Gore. He is nicknamed the "Starving Artist" in-game, and battles the player by having his paintings of ghosts come to life and attack Luigi. He speaks with a French accent, despite van Gogh speaking mostly Dutch.
- The character of Vince, the art tutor in the Nintendo DS game Art Academy, is based on Vincent van Gogh.
- The 2012 game New Super Mario Bros. U, as well its 2019 port New Super Mario Bros. U Deluxe, features a level paying homage to Van Gogh's The Starry Night entitled "Painted Swampland", or Soda Jungle-4; the level can be found in the sub-area of Soda Jungle in World 5–4.
- In 2013, the "Year of Luigi", The Starry Night motif was reused, this time in a level in the New Super Mario Bros. U spin-off game New Super Luigi U entitled "Painted Pipeworks", or Soda Jungle-4; as in New Super Mario Bros. U, the level can be found in the sub-area of Soda Jungle in World 5–4.
- In June 2015, Rusty Lake created the third installment of Cube Escape, Cube Escape: Arles. This installment ended in Van Gogh walking out into the painting The Starry Night.
- In July 2026, a seasonal event known as Dear van Gogh was launched in the video game Sky: Children of the Light, centered on the players exploring his paintings, his past, and his legacy.

== Popular recognition ==
- In 2004, he was nominated for the title De Grootste Nederlander (The Greatest Dutchman) and came in 10th place.
