= The Passions of the Mind =

1971 biographical novel by Irving Stone

- Cover of the first edition
- Author: Irving Stone
- Language: English
- Genre: Biographical, Historical novel
- Publisher: Doubleday
- Publication date: 1971
- Publication place: United States
- Pages: 808
- ISBN: 0385025688
- OCLC: 126451

The Passions of the Mind (1971) is a biographical novel about Sigmund Freud by American author Irving Stone. The book spans the time period from Freud's struggles as a medical student in the early 1880s, to his flight from Austria in the late 1930s to escape Nazi persecution. Stone offers a detailed look at Freud's personal and professional life, including his relationship with his parents, marriage to Martha Bernays, hospital work, case histories, psychoanalytic breakthroughs, and support for his successor, Carl Jung.

When the book was published, Stone was already renowned for writing a series of biographical novels, including Lust for Life (1934) about Vincent van Gogh, and The Agony and the Ecstasy (1961) about Michelangelo. The Passions of the Mind reached #1 on the fiction best seller list, and remained among the top fifteen sellers for nearly 30 weeks.

== Synopsis ==
The book opens in 1882. Freud is a medical student under the tutelage of Ernst Brücke at the University of Vienna. Freud has just met and fallen in love with Martha Bernays. He wants to earn enough money to marry her, and provide financial security for his parents, but is having difficulty choosing an area of medical specialization.

He learns about using hypnosis as a therapeutic tool in treating hysteria patients. At the time, he is being mentored by his friend Josef Breuer, who is working on a challenging case involving the patient Bertha Pappenheim, known as Anna O. Freud hears the term "talking cure" as a method of alleviating Anna O.'s hysteria-induced symptoms, which include partial paralysis.

In 1889, Freud begins treating Frau Emmy von Neustadt, who has just had a mental breakdown and is "a veritable laboratory of ideational illnesses". He has an insight about the unconscious mind, and how it functions separately from the conscious mind. He had initially used hypnotism as a key to unlock the unconscious, but through his daily sessions with Frau Emmy, he discovers that unconscious material can be unearthed through talk therapy and what he later labels "free association".

Freud theorizes that the neurosis afflicting most of his patients can be traced to anxiety over unpleasant or traumatic experiences, often sexual in nature. He postulates that these experiences are pushed from conscious awareness into the unconscious, where the repressed thoughts and feelings affect behavior and harm mental health.

Throughout the 1890s, Freud publishes groundbreaking studies on hysteria, infantile sexuality, and the Oedipus complex. By the end of the decade in fin-de-siècle Vienna, he has established his reputation in the new field of psychoanalysis. His first major book, The Interpretation of Dreams, is published in 1899, and he becomes a professor in 1902.

Carl Jung emerges in Freud's circle as a close ally and potential successor, with a shared enthusiasm for exploring the unconscious. However, the two men's views start to diverge, especially regarding the role of sexuality in psychic life, and leads to a painful estrangement.

Freud lives through the demise of the Austro-Hungarian Empire, and the rise of the Nazis. At the end of the book, he flees to England shortly before his death from cancer.

== Background ==
Stone once again used fictional techniques to bring a historical figure to life. In an article on the biographical novel genre, Dorrit Cohn cites the chapter from The Passions of the Mind in which Freud discovers the Oedipus complex while wrestling with his own powerful feelings of guilt. Stone depicts his subject's "childhood memories surfacing in his mind, inner voices resisting the awful truth", and portrays Freud in bed one night dreaming of his nude mother and wishing his father dead.

In the Acknowledgments, Stone noted that the book involved "six years of uninterrupted research and writing". He conducted dozens of interviews, reviewed all of Freud's clinical records, and was granted access by Carl Jung's family to then-unpublished Freud-Jung letters. Jean Stone, the author's wife and longtime literary partner, said that she and her husband devoted nearly three years to the research phase, with two of those years spent in Vienna, London and Zurich.

== Reception ==
Reviews were mixed. In The Philadelphia Inquirer, David Appel praised the work as a "monumental biographical novel" comparable to Stone's prior books on Vincent Van Gogh, Michelangelo, and Abigail Adams: "Here is another example of impressive documentation, of research that leaves no source unprobed and no page unturned. Yet for all the weight of investigation, the story moves with sustained pace, for Stone uses his accumulated materials with a knowing hand, never forgetting the main thrust, the story of an explorer on the uncharted seas of the human mind."

In The New York Times, Richard Locke was particularly harsh in his assessment. He said the book was bogged down by too much detail:

Even as a novel The Passions of the Mind is astonishingly inept. The narrative—if one can use the term about a book that has the inertia of an old file cabinet—is remarkably ill‐proportioned and unprofessional. Stone chooses to begin with Freud's engagement to Martha Bernays and the nearly simultaneous news that he cannot become a research scientist. But as Stone diligently plunges the reader into all the details of Freud's medical training in Vienna and Paris, the sheer mass of technical information swamps the book and we get no sense of Freud's inner evolution as a doctor or man.

Wilson Sullivan voiced similar complaints in the Saturday Review that the novel "is too prolix, too plodding in style, too cluttered with needless minutiae, too stiff in its dialogue". In The Detroit News, Jay McCormick was more tolerant of the novel's length, stating that "Irving Stone is not a chronic best-seller by accident. He knows how to tell a story, and he does so here in The Passions of the Mind with sufficient success to overcome what after all are no worse than faults of thoroughness. Certainly much of the massive detail in his 800 pages adds authenticity and weight to the decades of discovery and disappointment which formed the life of this great man who dared to have a great idea."

Writing in the Courier-Post, Jane Balliett acknowledged:

Stone has included nearly every important case Freud handled in forming his theories of the human mind. If the book has a weakness it is in the plethora of case histories thrown at the reader to illustrate the discovery of each point in the Freudian system. Even if the cases slow the book, they do so only momentarily and possibly necessarily. A few pages later Stone has completely recaptured the reader's interest. The book is fascinating and it is virtually assured a place on this Spring's best seller lists.

By 1973, the novel had sold over a million copies.
