= Adversary in the House =

1947 biographical novel by Irving Stone

- First edition (publ. Doubleday)
- Author: Irving Stone
- Publisher: Doubleday
- Publication date: September 26, 1947

Adversary in the House (1947) is a biographical novel by American writer Irving Stone, based on the life of prominent socialist Eugene V. Debs and of his wife Kate, who was opposed to socialism. (Note: Kate Debs seemed to have been so hostile to Debs's socialist activities - it threatened her sense of middle-class respectability - that novelist Irving Stone was led to call her, in the title of his fictional portrayal of the life of Debs, the Adversary in the House.) The book is Irving Stone's portrayal of Debs's "tempestuous relationship with a wife who rejects the very values he holds most dear".
