= Those Who Love =

Those Who Love may refer to:

- Those Who Love (1926 film), a 1926 Australian film
- Those Who Love (1929 film), a 1929 British film
- Those Who Love (novel) a 1965 American novel
