= Vincent & Theo =

1990 biographical drama film about Vincent Van Gogh

- U.S. theatrical release poster
- Directed by: Robert Altman
- Written by: Julian Mitchell
- Produced by: Ludi Boeken; David Conroy
- Starring: Tim Roth; Paul Rhys
- Cinematography: Jean Lépine
- Edited by: Françoise Coispeau; Geraldine Peroni
- Music by: Gabriel Yared
- Distributed by: Hungry Eye Pictures (Netherlands); Blue Dolphin Film Dists (United Kingdom); Jean-Paul Bretagnolle (France); Hemdale Film Corporation (United States)
- Release date: 2 November 1990
- Running time: 200 minutes (broadcast); 140 minutes (theatrical)
- Countries: Netherlands; United Kingdom; France; Italy; Germany
- Language: English
- Box office: $2.2 million

Vincent & Theo is a 1990 biographical drama film about the Dutch painter Vincent van Gogh (1853–1890) and his brother Theo (1857–1891), an art dealer. While Vincent van Gogh's artworks are now famous, he was essentially unrecognized in his lifetime, and survived on his brother's charity. The film was directed by Robert Altman, and starred Tim Roth and Paul Rhys in the title roles.

The film was made as a four-hour mini-series (200-minute length) for television, and an 138-minute version was released to theatres.

== Plot ==
Vincent & Theo has a prelude, which is documentary footage of the 1987 auction of one of Vincent van Gogh's paintings at Christie's, a famed London art business. The painting sells for millions of pounds. The film then cuts to scenes that take place in the period from 1883 through 1891, commencing with Vincent van Gogh's decision to work exclusively as an artist, and concluding with his death and that of his brother Theo a few months later. The film is a double portrait of both men; Noel Murray has summarised this aspect, "Altman and screenwriter Julian Mitchell contrast Theo's life—which mostly consists of him guiding rich people through galleries and selling them paintings he despises—with Vincent's gradual development of his own voice and style, through hard physical labor. Vincent & Theo also shows both men as warped by a similar madness, torn between their lusts for sex and alcohol, and their yearnings for social respectability and religious connection."

The film portrays several of the better-known episodes of this period of the brothers' lives, including Vincent van Gogh's move from his brother's apartment in Paris to Provence, Theo van Gogh's establishment of an art gallery in Paris and his marriage to Jo Bonger, Vincent van Gogh's relationship with the painter Paul Gauguin in Provence, his mutilation of his earlobe, the birth of their son Vincent Willem to Johanna and Theo van Gogh, Vincent van Gogh's care by the physician Paul Gachet, and his ultimate suicide.

== Cast ==
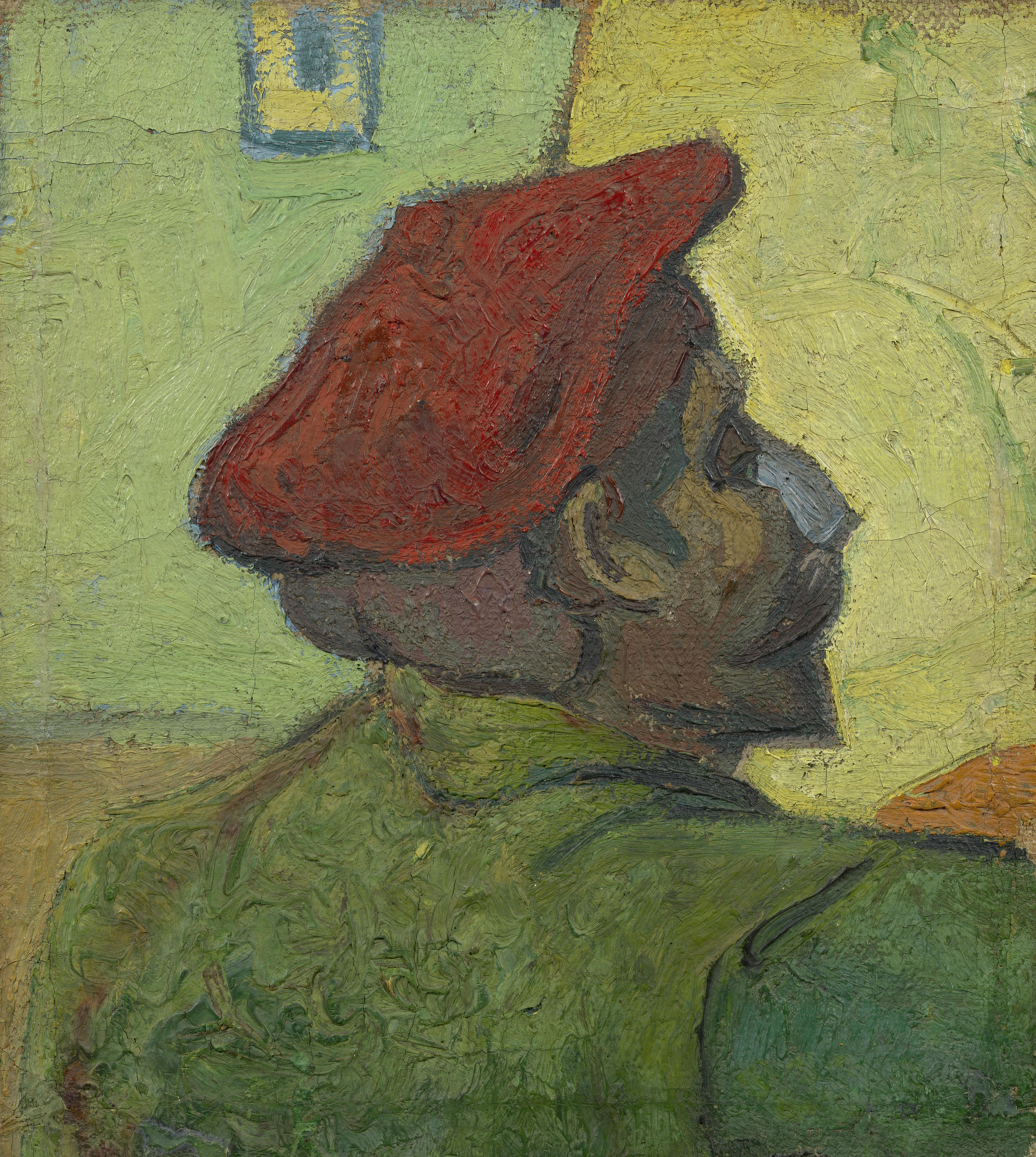
Vincent van Gogh's painting Portrait of Gauguin (1888). Vincent & Theo incorporates the period when Gauguin and van Gogh lived and worked together in Arles, when van Gogh painted this small portrait.

While the roles of the van Gogh brothers were played by British actors Tim Roth and Paul Rhys, the remaining Dutch and French roles were generally played by Dutch and French actors.

- Tim Roth as Vincent van Gogh. Through the 1980s, Roth had maintained dual careers as a stage and film actor in Britain. Following his success in Vincent & Theo, Roth established a career in the United States with prominent roles in Quentin Tarantino's films Reservoir Dogs (1992) and Pulp Fiction (1994).
- Paul Rhys as Theo Van Gogh
- Kitty Courbois as Anna van Gogh (the sister of Vincent and Theo van Gogh)
- Johanna ter Steege as Jo Bonger
- Wladimir Yordanoff as Paul Gauguin
- Adrian Brine as Uncle Cent (Vincent (Cent) van Gogh, the uncle of Vincent and Theo van Gogh)
- Jip Wijngaarden as Sien Hoornik
- Hans Kesting as Andries Bonger (Johanna Bonger's brother)
- Jean-Pierre Cassel as Paul Gachet
- Bernadette Giraud as Marguerite Gachet
- Anne Canovas as Marie
- Jean-Denis Monory as Émile Bernard
- Peter Tuinman as Anton Mauve
- Vincent Vallier as René Valadon
- Jean-François Perrier as Leon Boussod
- Jean-Pierre Castaldi as Father Tanguy
- Féodor Atkine as Dr. Peyron

== Production ==
=== Screenplay ===
Julian Mitchell was the screenwriter for Vincent & Theo; he was known at the time for his play Another Country (1981) and its film adaptation (1984). Vincent van Gogh's life has been portrayed many times. Mitchell's screenplay is unusual in its concentration upon the relationship of Vincent and Theo van Gogh. Gary Giddins notes that "most of the film (and this is strictly true for the first hour) alternates episodes from Vincent's life with those from Theo's. ... there isn't much serenity in either of their lives, and perhaps the most disturbing element of Vincent & Theo is the reluctance to extend any hope to them. ... Vincent & Theo is less concerned with stockpiling facts than canvassing an accumulation of insights through the crafting of a time, place, and mood that allows the van Goghs to leap out of history in all their ungainly glory."

=== Production design ===
The production design for Vincent & Theo was done by Stephen Altman, the director's son. Noel Murray wrote in 2015, "Altman's production-designer son Stephen—the unsung hero of his later films—could almost be credited as the co-author of Vincent & Theo for how well he recreates late-19th-century Europe in both its tactile grime and its old world quaintness. The Altmans bring Van Gogh's subjects back to life."

=== Musical score ===
The composer Gabriel Yared had previously worked with Altman on the film Beyond Therapy (1987). For that film as well as for Vincent & Theo, Yared composed "away from the film", with only a screenplay and general guidance from Altman. He himself considered the score to be "maybe the most creative music he had done". Several critics have remarked favourably on his "compulsive", "vexing" score that "finely underscores the underlying testy dynamics of living only for art." Yared's 1996 score for The English Patient won an Academy Award and a BAFTA Award.

=== Editing ===
The editing of Vincent & Theo produced two versions of the film: the 200 minute television version, and the 138 minute theatrical version. Altman was working in France, apparently with Françoise Coispeau, and wanted a second editor who was a native English speaker. He had met Geraldine Peroni in 1984 when she was an assistant editor on his earlier film O.C. and Stiggs. Vincent & Theo became her second credit as editor. She ultimately edited seven further films with Altman, and for their next film, the highly successful The Player (1992), Altman was nominated for the Academy Award for Best Director and Peroni was nominated for Best Film Editing.

Robert Altman's films are well known for "overlapping" sound editing of dialogue in which several voices and background sounds are combined to create a naturalistic effect. Conventional sound editing presents the main speaker's voice prominently. The dialogue editing in Vincent & Theo is fairly conventional, but there is one exception at the beginning of the film that has been noted by several critics. The first scene of the films shows the 1987 auction of a van Gogh painting. There is then a cut to a scene with the impoverished van Gogh brothers that takes place a century earlier, but the sound from the auction continues after the cut and is blended with the dialogue for about 30 seconds.

== Reception ==
Vincent & Theo received positive reviews from critics, and in 2023 the review aggregator Rotten Tomatoes gave the film a 90% rating based on 29 reviews. In 1990, Peter Travers wrote that the film "is an Altman masterpiece" while Owen Gleiberman wrote "Vincent & Theo looks and feels like a half-baked PBS drama, and at two hours and 20 minutes the movie is hopelessly plodding." In 2015 Noel Murray wrote, "Vincent & Theo masterfully illustrates the way artists enjoy the power to transform real life into a thing of beauty."

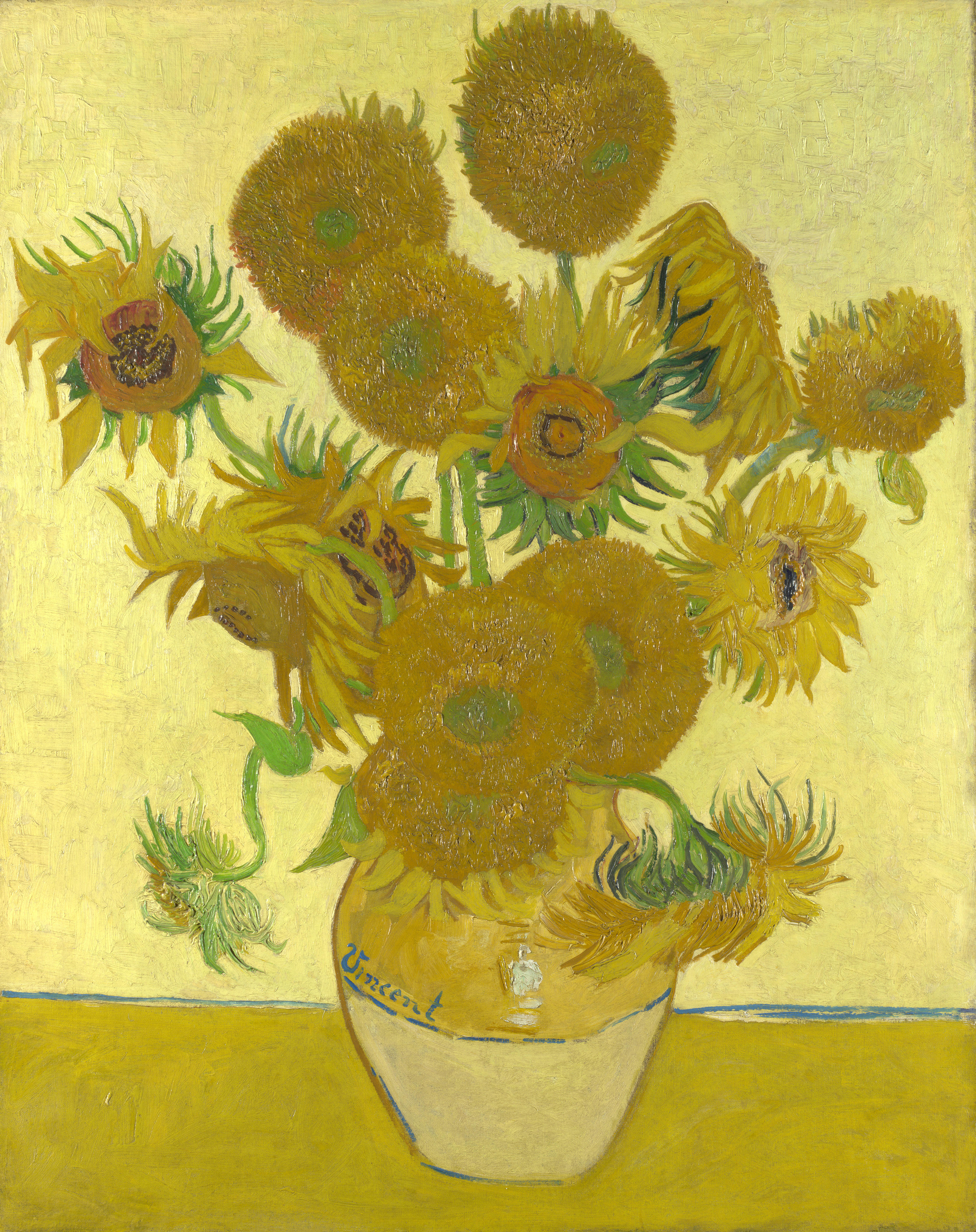
The first scene of Vincent & Theo is the March 1987 auction of van Gogh's Vase with Fifteen Sunflowers (1888).

Reviewers have commented on the successes of Tim Roth and of Paul Rhys in their roles as Vincent and Theo van Gogh. An unsigned review in Variety noted "Tim Roth powerfully conveys Vincent's heroic, obsessive concentration on his work, and then resultant loneliness and isolation." The same reviewer wrote "Paul Rhys skillfully inhabits a character even more wretchedly unhappy than his brother, who at least has the consolation of his art, and Theo’s own incipient madness gives the film much of its unsettling tone." Desson Thomson wrote, "As Vincent, Tim Roth is, without a doubt, the best thing about this movie ... presents a soft-souled, black-toothed, endearingly tormented artist, willing to take his work as far as it can go." Roger Ebert wrote "here is Robert Altman's Vincent and Theo, another film that generates the feeling that we are in the presence of a man in the act of creation."

Vincent & Theo opens with historical footage of the March 1987 auction at Christie's of Vincent van Gogh's painting Vase with Fifteen Sunflowers for a record-breaking price. The later scene of Vincent van Gogh attempting to paint sunflowers a century before the auction has been noted by several critics. Peter Rainer wrote in 1990 that "The scene where he destroys his canvasses in a field of sunflowers has an almost oracular power. In moments like these Altman gets so far inside Vincent's impacted agonies that the effect is almost dizzying." Roger Ebert wrote of "a remarkable scene in a field of sunflowers, where, as van Gogh paints, Altman's camera darts restlessly, aggressively, at the flowers, turning them from passive subjects into an alien hostile environment. The film is able to see the sunflowers as Altman believed van Gogh saw them."

=== Vincent & Theo in Robert Altman's career ===
Robert Altman has been included on several lists of the greatest directors. He was nearly unknown as a feature film director when, at 45 years old, he directed the 1970 film MASH, which was popular, very profitable, and widely appreciated by critics. He then directed a series of critically successful films in the 1970s, of which the best known is probably Nashville (1975). Few were profitable, and following Popeye (1980) he had largely lost his access to major funding for feature films. The 1980s became a decade during which Altman "worked small" on low-budget films and returned to his roots directing for television. Released in 1990, Vincent and Theo was "something of a love child of TV and the movies"; conceived as a television miniseries, Altman secured a deal in which he would simultaneously make a version for theatrical release. Of his three dozen or so feature films, Vincent & Theo, Secret Honor (1984), and the very early The James Dean Story (1957) are the only biographical films.

Vincent & Theo was widely praised by critics and sufficiently promising that Altman was then able to secure financing for The Player (1992). The Player was both profitable and critically successful. The film was nominated for the BAFTA Award for Best Film, Altman won the BAFTA Award for Directing and was nominated for the Academy Award for Best Director. Following its success Altman was able to secure financing for nine films from Short Cuts (1993) through his final film, A Prairie Home Companion (2006).

== Home media ==
There have been many releases of Vincent & Theo to home media. The first home media release was in 1990, which is the same year that the film was televised and released to theatres. The theatrical version (138 minutes) was released as a region 2 DVD in 2004 in the United Kingdom. The theatrical version (138 minutes) was released as a DVD and as a Blu-ray DVD in 2015 in the United States. A US DVD release in 2005 included a featurette "Film as Fine Art" (24 minutes) with Robert and Stephen Altman; this featurette has not been included in later releases.

The entire television version (200 minutes) was released as a pair of region 2 DVD disks in 2007 in the United Kingdom; this release also includes a program on the making of the film that was broadcast on The South Bank Show in the United Kingdom in 1990. This version had not been released in the US as of 2015.

== See also ==
- List of cultural depictions of Vincent van Gogh
- Lust for Life, directed by Vincente Minnelli and starring Kirk Douglas, is a 1956 film about Vincent van Gogh with which Vincent & Theo is often compared. Gary Giddins compares the two films in some detail.
- Vincent is a 1987 documentary by Paul Cox; critic Dennis Schwartz wrote in 2007 that, "It's an unforgettable film experience from an artist who understands and appreciates the artist he's depicting."
- Loving Vincent, a 2017 biographical drama about the delivery of Vincent's final letter after his death to his brother and the circumstances surrounding his death. The film was animated using oil paintings made using Van Gogh's techniques.
