= Until I Say Good-Bye: My Year of Living with Joy =

2013 book by Susan Spencer-Wendel and Bret Witter

- Author: Susan Spencer-Wendel with Bret Witter
- Language: English
- Genre: Biographical, Memoir
- Publisher: HarperCollins
- Publication date: 2013
- Publication place: United States
- Media type: Print Hardcover, Paperback
- Pages: 357
- ISBN: 978-0-06-224145-0
- Dewey Decimal: B Sp345a1

Until I Say Good-Bye: My Year of Living with Joy is a memoir by Susan Spencer-Wendel and co-writer Bret Witter. This New York Times bestseller tells the story of Spencer-Wendel's life after she was diagnosed with a terminal illness. Determined to make the most of her remaining time, she pledged to spend an entire year devoted to joy and during the trip she took around the world with her family they spent much time as possible making each other happy. She also shared the story of living with her disease by writing a memoir whose goal was not to write about fear or despair, but to share the happy memories that she would create in her "final wonderful year." By the time she started writing the book, she was unable to speak or walk, and used her right thumb and an iPhone to write the memoir.

An audiobook version was also produced, narrated by Karen White.

== Synopsis ==
In 2009, Spencer-Wendel is a successful award-winning reporter for The Palm Beach Post, a wife, and a mother of three. One night, she notices that her left hand looks withered and dying. She and her husband decide to go to the doctor's immediately to have it looked at. After about a year of doctor's visits without much answers, she is finally given a diagnosis in 2011: amyotrophic lateral sclerosis (ALS, also known as Lou Gehrig's disease).

After spending about a year in denial and searching for other possible diagnoses, she accepts her fate. Then she makes a decision to spend her time remaining - at least a year, maybe longer - dedicated to joy. She decides to go on all the trips that she'd ever wanted to take, and taker her family with her as they visit seven different places: the Yukon, the Bahamas, California, Budapest, Cyprus, New York, and Sanibel & Captiva Island. She also decides to make her backyard a relaxing area with a thatched hut. Because she knows she will not live to see her daughter's wedding day, she takes her daughter shopping and has her try on a wedding dress. The family also adopted a new dog, Gracie, in 2010.

== Main characters ==
- Susan Spencer-Wendel, a mother in her mid-forties who is diagnosed with ALS
- John Wendel, her husband, a high-school teacher
- Marina, her fourteen-year-old daughter
- Aubrey, her eleven-year-old son
- Wesley, her nine-year-old son with autism
- Stephanie, her sister, a respiratory therapist - to whom the book is dedicated
- Don, Stephanie's husband, also a respiratory therapist
- Nancy Kinnally, her best friend since high school, who accompanied her to the Yukon Territory to see the Northern Lights
- Theodora "Tee" Spencer, her adopted mother
- Thomas Spencer, her adopted father
- Ellen Swenson, her biological mother, a retired nurse who worked at the Mayo Clinic

== Success ==
Within a year of the book's publication in 2013, it hit the best-seller's list of The New York Times, The Wall Street Journal, and Publishers Weekly. The book has been translated into 20 different languages.

== Aftermath ==
After the book's publication, the family adopted another dog, Leonard. Susan died from her disease on June 4, 2014.
