= The Origin (novel) =

1980 biographical novel by Irving Stone

First edition (publ. Doubleday)

The Origin is a biographical novel of the life of Charles Darwin written by Irving Stone. Darwin was a geologist and biologist, and could be considered the father of evolutionary theory. The novel begins with Darwin at the age of 22 and follows him through the Voyage of the Beagle until his death in 1882.

Stone took five years to research and write the novel and consulted Darwin scholars and Darwin's descendants.

== Publication details ==
- Stone, Irving. (1980) The Origin, Doubleday.
