= Immortal Wife =

1944 novel by Irving Stone

Immortal Wife is a best-selling fictional biography written by Irving Stone. The book came out in 1944 and is the story of Jessie Benton Frémont the well known and influential abolitionist and political activist. Her husband was Colonel John C. Frémont.

The book is a novel and not a factual biography, nor a factual history. It is a novelization of the woman and her actual relationships. It is told as a narration by Jessie. She relates the story of the court martial of her husband. This trial is a result of a dispute between Commodore Stockton of the Navy and General Kearny of the Army. This court martial is an actual historical event, that took place in January 1848 in Washington, D.C.

This book was recognized at the time of its publication for being a "history as dramatic and deeply moving as any novel or play, but without sacrificing accuracy and truth." Stone was noted for writing about overlooked, misunderstood, or unfairly misrepresented women who were married to and influenced well known historical figures. This was the first of a series of four such books he wrote. The New York Times called it "...a full and rounded portrait of two remarkable persons, and of a remarkable marriage...", and thought this book was impressive. The Times called it "an objective analysis of character..." so packed with facts that it is "a biography" rather than a novel. One reviewer called this book a grand love story, a grand edventure story, about "one of the most dramatic and controversial figures in our history," that is well told.

Paramount Pictures announced, in 1951, that they would produce a film based on this book starring Olivia de Havilland, but there is no evidence that it ever went into production.
