= They Also Ran =

1943 book by Irving Stone

- First edition
- Author: Irving Stone
- Language: English
- Subject: U.S. political and electoral history
- Publisher: Doubleday
- Publication date: 1943
- Publication place: United States
- OCLC: 421063
- Dewey Decimal: 920.073

They Also Ran: The Story of the Men Who Were Defeated for the Presidency (1943) is a non-fiction book about United States presidential candidates by American writer Irving Stone, known for his popular biographical novels of artists and intellectuals. An updated edition was published in 1966, with brief analyses of the 1944 through 1964 elections.

== Summary ==
Stone evaluates several unsuccessful candidates for President of the United States, from the elections of 1824 through 1940. He explores their places in history (and those of their victorious opponents), and tries to assess whether or not the American people made the "right" choice in choosing another candidate for that office.

== Structure ==
Stone groups the also-rans by profession, rather than listing them in chronological order. For example, the first section assesses newspapermen Horace Greeley and James M. Cox. Coincidentally Stone happens to rate them favorably compared to the candidates who were elected: Grant and Harding.

== Reception ==
The Chicago Tribune described They Also Ran as "a fascinating and challenging book." The New York Times praised it as "a brilliant idea ... brilliantly executed".

Boyd Lee Spahr, in The Pennsylvania Magazine of History and Biography, criticized the "lack of historical continuity" in the organization of the book, complaining that the grouping of candidates by profession did little to increase understanding. He particularly criticized the text for numerous errors related to several different candidates, and said that Stone did not reflect the consensus of historians on many candidates. He said:

Mr. Stone wields a trenchant pen but his penchant for striking sentences, and perhaps his prejudices, lead him into exaggerations and inaccuracies, with the result that some of the sketches seem like campaign propaganda, post-mortem pro or con, rather than impartial biography. In addition, factual errors are fairly numerous.

Spahr concluded that while Stone was entitled to his opinions, the inaccuracies decreased the book's value as a reference.

== 1966 edition ==
The book was published in an updated edition in 1966, incorporating material on elections from 1944 to 1964. It included the sections noted below:

Book	Chapter	Subject	Notes
Book One: "The Press Pass"	I	Horace Greeley
Book One: "The Press Pass"	II	James Middleton Cox
Book Two: "Three Time Losers!"	I	Henry Clay
Book Two: "Three Time Losers!"	II	William Jennings Bryan
Book Three: "Judge Not!"	I	Alton B. Parker
Book Three: "Judge Not!"	II	Charles Evans Hughes
Book Four: "Generals Die in the Army"	I	Winfield Scott
Book Four: "Generals Die in the Army"	II	John Charles Fremont
Book Four: "Generals Die in the Army"	III	George B. McClellan
Book Four: "Generals Die in the Army"	IV	Winfield Scott Hancock
Book Five: "Heroes Stand Alone"	I	Samuel J. Tilden
Book Six: "Main Chance Politicos"	I	Stephen A. Douglas
Book Six: "Main Chance Politicos"	II	James G. Blaine
Book Seven: "Governors, Pardon!"	I	Lewis Cass
Book Seven: "Governors, Pardon!"	II	Horatio Seymour
Book Seven: "Governors, Pardon!"	III	Alfred E. Smith
Book Seven: "Governors, Pardon!"	IV	Alfred M. Landon
Book Eight: "Honest Wall Street Lawyers"	I	John W. Davis
Book Eight: "Honest Wall Street Lawyers"	II	Wendell L. Willkie
Book Nine: "The Prosecutions Rest!"	I	Thomas E. Dewey
Book Ten: "Transition"	I	Adlai E. Stevenson
Book Ten: "Transition"	II	Richard M. Nixon	The 1968 U.S. presidential election had not yet occurred at the time of the writing.
Book Ten: "Transition"	III	Barry M. Goldwater

== Influence ==
- The book inspired the Also-Ran Gallery, founded in Norton, Kansas in 1965, a collection of black-and-white portraits of unsuccessful presidential candidates that is displayed within the First State Bank building.

== See also ==
- The Contenders
