= Lust for Life (1956 film) =

1956 film by Vincente Minnelli, George Cukor

- Theatrical release poster
- Directed by: Vincente Minnelli
- Screenplay by: Norman Corwin
- Based on: Lust for Life; 1934 novel by Irving Stone
- Produced by: John Houseman
- Starring: Kirk Douglas; Anthony Quinn; James Donald
- Cinematography: Russell Harlan; F. A. Young
- Edited by: Adrienne Fazan
- Music by: Miklós Rózsa
- Distributed by: Metro-Goldwyn-Mayer
- Release date: September 17, 1956
- Running time: 122 minutes
- Country: United States
- Language: English
- Budget: $3,227,000
- Box office: $2,695,000 (rentals)

Lust for Life is a 1956 American biographical film about the life of the Dutch painter Vincent van Gogh, based on the 1934 novel of the same title by Irving Stone which was adapted for the screen by Norman Corwin.

It was directed by Vincente Minnelli and produced by John Houseman. The film stars Kirk Douglas as Van Gogh, James Donald as his brother Theo, with Pamela Brown, Everett Sloane, and Anthony Quinn. Douglas won the Golden Globe Award for Best Actor in a Motion Picture – Drama and the New York Film Critics Circle Award for Best Actor for his performance, while Quinn won the Academy Award for Best Supporting Actor.

== Plot ==
Vincent has trained to be a minister, like his father, but the church authorities find him unsuitable. He pleads with them to be allowed some position and they place him in a very poor mining community. Here he becomes deeply absorbed in the miners' plight and begins sketching their daily life.

The religious leaders do not like his approach, and they frown on his social activism and care for the poor. He returns home to his father's house. Here a woman he obsessively loves (his cousin) rejects Van Gogh because of his inability to support himself financially. The infatuated Vincent follows her to her family home, where he holds his hand over a candle flame to prove his devotion, only to learn that she has said she is disgusted by him and doesn't want to see him again.

He takes to drawing. His cousin Anton Mauve gives him paint and art materials and encourages him to paint. His brother, Theo van Gogh, provides financial and moral support. Vincent takes up with a prostitute who eventually also leaves because he is too poor. His passion then turns fully to painting, which he pursues while agonizing that he is unable to paint precisely what he sees.

After his father's death, he goes to Paris with Theo, where he discovers the impressionists. Theo cannot bear living with him and Vincent leaves for sunny Arles, France. Paul Gauguin (whom he met in Paris) joins him there, and for a while life is good. However, Vincent is too obsessive even for Gauguin's tastes and they argue, prompting the latter's departure, after which Vincent cuts off his own ear. Vincent begins experiencing seizures and voluntarily commits himself to a mental institution, where he is allowed to paint. He signs himself out, and with Theo's help returns to a rural area to resume painting. While painting cornfields, he is frustrated by the crows and, despairing at never being able to put what he sees on canvas, pulls out a revolver and shoots himself. He dies in bed a few days later.

== Cast ==
- Kirk Douglas as Vincent van Gogh, struggling painter
- Anthony Quinn as Paul Gauguin, painter and friend of Vincent's
- James Donald as Theo van Gogh, Vincent's brother
- Pamela Brown as Christine, Vincent's lover, based on Sien
- Everett Sloane as Dr. Paul Gachet
- Henry Daniell as Theodorus van Gogh, father of Vincent and Theo
- Madge Kennedy as Anna Cornelia van Gogh, mother of Vincent and Theo
- Noel Purcell as Anton Mauve, established painter and cousin of Vincent and Theo
- Niall MacGinnis as Roulin
- Jill Bennett as Willemien
- Lionel Jeffries as Dr. Peyron
- Laurence Naismith as Dr. Bosman
- Eric Pohlmann as Colbert
- Jeanette Sterke as Kay (Cornelia "Kee" Vos-Stricker), cousin of Vincent and Theo
- Toni Gerry as Johanna (Johanna van Gogh-Bonger)

== Production ==
The film was based on the 1934 novel by Irving Stone and adapted by Norman Corwin. Vincente Minnelli directed the film, while John Houseman produced it. They worked with Douglas on the 1952 melodrama The Bad and the Beautiful, for which he was nominated for an Academy Award for Best Actor. In 1954, Douglas secured the filming rights to Van Gogh's biography and intended to star and produce it through his own film production company, Bryna Productions, with Jean Negulesco directing and financial distribution backing from United Artists.

Vincente Minnelli was finally chosen as director. The late screenwriter Norman Corwin recalled working with Minnelli: "There are directors who would have taken over. Minnelli was respectful of the script. He approached it almost as a writer would to get the essence, and be true to the material, true to history, true to the letters [Van Gogh had written his brother, Theo], true to what I had written."

Principal photography started in August and ended in December 1955 and it was shot on location in France, Belgium and the Netherlands. Two hundred enlarged colour photos were used representing Vincent’s completed canvases; these were in addition to copies that were executed by an American art teacher, Robert Parker. To prepare for his role as the troubled painter, Douglas practiced painting crows so that he could reasonably imitate van Gogh at work. According to his wife Anne, Douglas would return home from work still in character. When asked if he would do such a thing again, Douglas responded that he would not.

== Reception ==
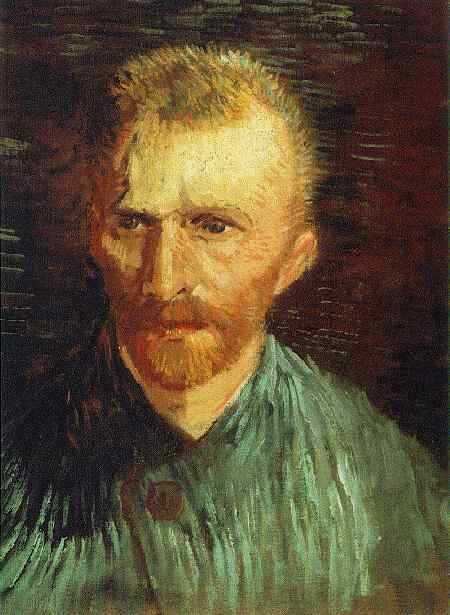
Vincent van Gogh, Self-Portrait, mid-1887, Paris Van Gogh Museum, Amsterdam (F77v)

=== Critical reaction ===
The New York Times critic Bosley Crowther praised the film's conception, acting and color scheme, noting the design team "consciously made the flow of color and the interplay of compositions and hues the most forceful devices for conveying a motion picture comprehension of van Gogh." Whitney Williams of Variety said, "This is a slow-moving picture whose only action is in the dialog itself. Basically a faithful portrait of Van Gogh, Lust for Life is nonetheless unexciting. It misses out in conveying the color and entertainment of the original Irving Stone novel."

Harrison's Reports wrote that the film had been given "an excellent production" and that "Kirk Douglas does outstanding work as Van Gogh, and Anthony Quinn is very good as Paul Gauguin, his friend." John McCarten of The New Yorker wrote, "Even if the movie doesn't delve as deeply as it might into the mental processes that made van Gogh behave the way he did, it nevertheless, in the person of Kirk Douglas, confronts us with a character well worth our absorbed attention. Mr. Douglas, who, wearing red whiskers, bears a striking resemblance to van Gogh's self-portraits, succeeds most skillfully in arousing a conviction that he is, in truth, a painter beside himself to capture light and hold it forever on canvas."

Richard L. Coe of The Washington Post called the film "a remarkable achievement, combining a rich adventure in the art of color with a perceptive study of a creative personality. In this biography of Vincent Van Gogh, Kirk Douglas adds to his advantage of striking resemblance a performance of powerful sensitivity." Edwin Schallert of the Los Angeles Times called the film a "remarkable and poignant study," and forecast that the artist's 'stellar portrayal' by Kirk Douglas "will be recognized for Academy honors." The Monthly Film Bulletin printed a somewhat negative review, writing: "Although one feels that those responsible were determined to 'do right' by Van Gogh, this biographical tribute never rises above the level of the popular novel on which it is based ... Despite a remarkable physical resemblance, Kirk Douglas' performance remains essentially an American study in neuroticism; also, the presentation of the aesthetic controversy between Van Gogh (humane and intuitive) and Gauguin (intellectual and brusquely cynical) is both oversimplified and somewhat misleading."

=== Box office ===
The world premiere was held at the Caley Picture House as part of the Edinburgh Film Festival on August 19, 1956. It subsequently opened on September 17, 17 at the Plaza Theatre on East 58th Street in New York City as a benefit for the Metropolitan Museum of Art's student program. It played there for a record 37 weeks, grossing $450,000.

Despite its accolades, the movie was a financial failure. According to MGM records, the film earned rentals of $1,595,000 in the US and Canada and $1,100,000 elsewhere, resulting in a loss of $2,072,000.

=== Accolades ===
Award	Category	Nominee(s)	Result	Ref.
Academy Awards	Best Actor	Kirk Douglas	Nominated	
Academy Awards	Best Supporting Actor	Anthony Quinn	Won	
Academy Awards	Best Screenplay – Adapted	Norman Corwin	Nominated	
Academy Awards	Best Art Direction – Color	Art Direction: Cedric Gibbons, Hans Peters, and E. Preston Ames; Set Decoration: Edwin B. Willis and F. Keogh Gleason	Nominated	
Golden Globe Awards	Best Motion Picture – Drama		Nominated	
Golden Globe Awards	Best Actor in a Motion Picture – Drama	Kirk Douglas	Won	
Golden Globe Awards	Best Supporting Actor – Motion Picture	Anthony Quinn	Nominated	
Golden Globe Awards	Best Director – Motion Picture	Vincente Minnelli	Nominated	
National Board of Review Awards	Top Ten Films		4th Place	
New York Film Critics Circle Awards	Best Actor	Kirk Douglas	Won	

== Companion short film ==
MGM produced a short film, Van Gogh: Darkness Into Light, narrated by Dore Schary and showing the European locations used for the filming, to promote Lust for Life. In the film, a 75-year-old woman from Auvers-sur-Oise (not Jeanne Calment, who lived in Arles several hundred kilometers to the south), who claims to have known Van Gogh when she was a young girl, meets star Kirk Douglas, and comments on how much he looks like the painter. This short promotional film is shown on Turner Classic Movies occasionally. At the start and ending of the film, the creators thank a number of galleries, collectors and historians who allowed the works of Van Gogh to be photographed for the film.

== See also ==
- List of American films of 1956
- Death of Vincent van Gogh
- Vincent (1987 documentary)
- Vincent & Theo (1990 biographical film about van Gogh that is often compared to Lust for Life)
- Loving Vincent (2017 film about van Gogh)
- At Eternity's Gate (2018 biographical film about van Gogh)
