= Those Who Love (novel) =

1965 novel by Irving Stone

- First edition
- Author: Irving Stone
- Language: English
- Genre: Biographical, Historical novel
- Publisher: Doubleday
- Publication date: October 22, 1965
- Publication place: United States
- Media type: Print (Hardback & Paperback)
- Pages: 672

Those Who Love is a biographical novel of John Adams, as told from the perspective of his wife, Abigail Adams. It was written by American author Irving Stone.
