= The Contenders =

- Country of origin: United States
- Original language: English
- No. of seasons: 1
- No. of episodes: 14

Production
- Executive producer: Mark Farkas

Original release
- Network: C-SPAN
- Release: September 9 – December 9, 2011

The Contenders is a 14-program series that was produced and aired by C-SPAN in the fall of 2011. It looked at the lives and careers of 14 candidates for the presidency of the United States who were determined to have made significant impacts on U.S. politics despite not having won the presidency. Most episodes were broadcast from a location of significance to the person being profiled, and featured interviews and discussion with a variety of experts.

== Selection of subjects ==
The list of persons profiled was selected by C-SPAN producer Mark Farkas and historian Richard Norton Smith, who was a consultant to the series. Smith described the objective of their efforts as follows:

To give viewers an alternative school of American political history, in particular. It has famously been observed that the winners write the history books, and there's a lot of truth to that. But that means that we are deprived of... It's like the dark side of the moon. There's another whole story line... and even more, on the biographical level, there are 14 people in this series, many of whom I guarantee viewers may never have heard of. And all of whom I can pretty much guarantee they will find interesting to fascinating, and certainly surprising.

== Programs ==
Original air date (Links to video of program)	Featured candidate	Featured location	Interviewees
September 2, 2011	Historians' Preview	N/A	Richard Norton Smith, Jean Baker, Carl Cannon
September 9, 2011	Henry Clay	The Ashland Estate, Lexington, Kentucky	James C. Klotter, Avery Malone, Alicestyne Turley
September 16, 2011	James G. Blaine	The Blaine House, Augusta, Maine	Elizabeth D. Leonard, Paul LePage, Neil Rolde, Earle G. Shettleworth Jr.
September 23, 2011	William Jennings Bryan	Fairview, Lincoln, Nebraska	Michael Kazin, L. Robert Puschendorf, William G. Thomas III
September 30, 2011	Eugene Debs	Eugene V. Debs Home, Terre Haute, Indiana	Ernest Freeberg, Lisa A.W. Phillips, Bernie Sanders
October 7, 2011	Charles Evans Hughes	United States Supreme Court Building, Washington, D.C.	Paul D. Clement, Bernadette A. Meyler, Robb W. Patryk, David Pietrusza
October 14, 2011	Al Smith	Chamber of the New York State Assembly, New York State Capitol, Albany, New York	John J. Evers, Beverly Gage, Sheldon Silver, Alfred E. Smith IV
October 21, 2011	Wendell Willkie	Rush County Historical Society, Rushville, Indiana	Richard Lugar, James H. Madison, Amity Shlaes, David Willkie
October 28, 2011	Thomas E. Dewey	The Roosevelt Hotel, New York City, New York	Thomas E. Dewey Jr., Richard Norton Smith
November 4, 2011	Adlai Stevenson	Adlai E. Stevenson Historic Home, Mettawa, Illinois	Newton N. Minow, Richard Norton Smith, Adlai E. Stevenson III
November 11, 2011	Barry Goldwater	The Goldwater Institute, Phoenix, Arizona	Bill McCune, Darcy Olsen, Rick Perlstein,
November 18, 2011	Hubert Humphrey	The Minnesota History Center, St. Paul, Minnesota	Mick Caouette, Juan Williams
November 25, 2011	George Wallace	The Alabama Governor's Mansion, Montgomery, Alabama	Dan T. Carter, Peggy Wallace Kennedy, Joe L. Reed
December 2, 2011	George McGovern	McGovern Center for Leadership, Dakota Wesleyan University, Mitchell, South Dakota	Scott Clark Farris, Jules Witcover (Note: McGovern himself had been scheduled to be part of this program, but fell and injured himself on the way into the building where the program was being filmed.)
December 9, 2011	Ross Perot	Washington, D.C.	Carolyn Barta, Douglas Brinkley
December 16, 2011	Historians' Retrospective	N/A	Richard Norton Smith, Jean Baker, Carl Cannon

== See also ==
- They Also Ran
