= Frémont Emancipation =

Military proclamation by John C. Fremont

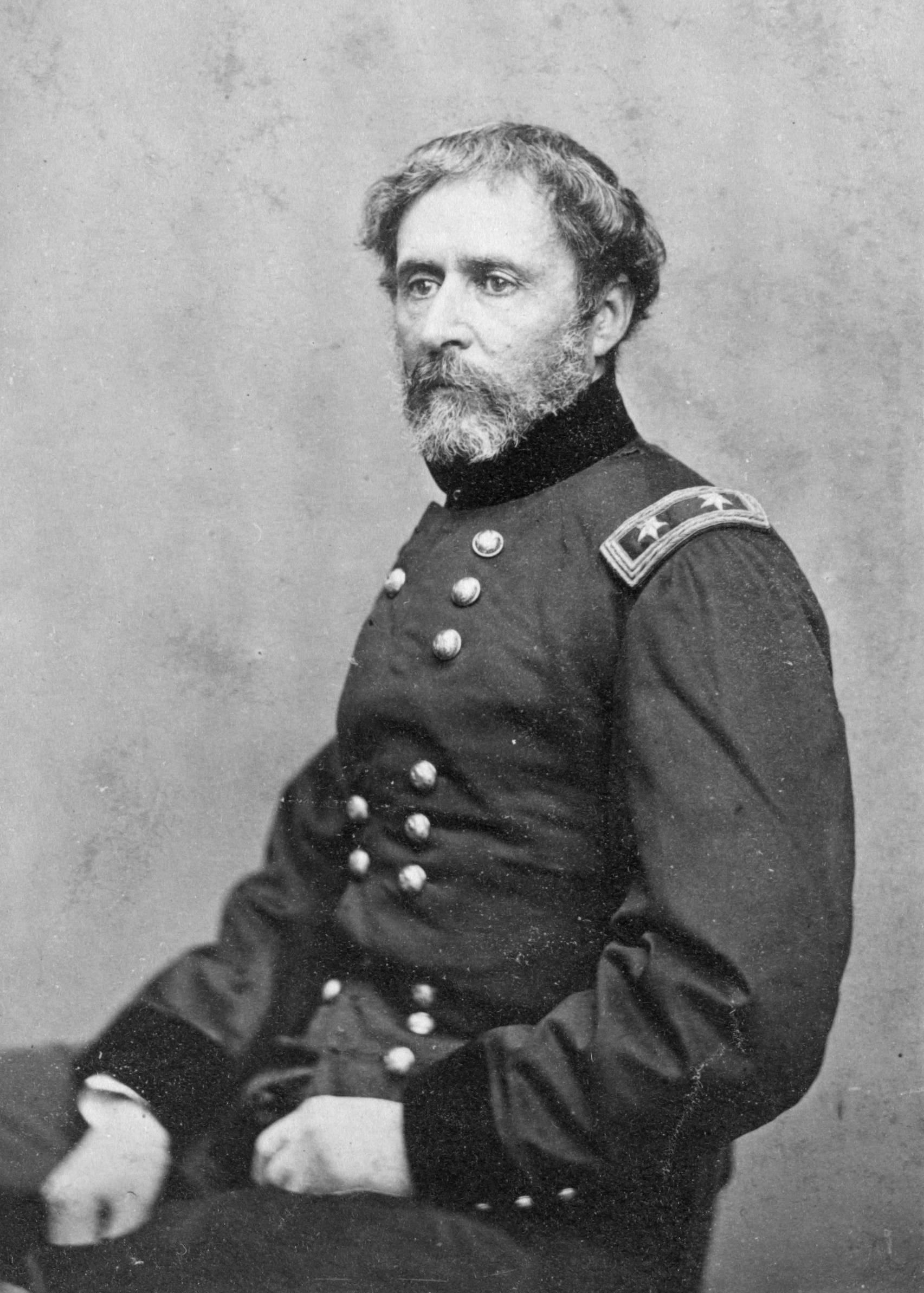
Major General John C. Frémont circa 1861.

The Frémont Emancipation was part of a military proclamation issued by Major General John C. Frémont (1813–1890) on August 30, 1861, in St. Louis, Missouri, during the early months of the American Civil War. The proclamation placed the state of Missouri under martial law and decreed that all property of those bearing arms in rebellion would be confiscated, including slaves, and that confiscated slaves would subsequently be declared free. It also imposed capital punishment for those in rebellion against the federal government.

Frémont, a career army officer, frontiersman and politician, was in command of the military Department of the West from July 1861 to October 1861. Although Frémont claimed his proclamation was intended only as a means of deterring secessionists in Missouri, his policy had national repercussions, potentially setting a highly controversial precedent that the Civil War would be a war of liberation.

For President Abraham Lincoln the proclamation created a difficult situation, as he tried to balance the agendas of Radical Republicans who favored abolition and slave-holding Unionists in the American border states whose support was essential in keeping the states of Missouri, Kentucky and Maryland in the Union.

Nationwide reaction to the proclamation was mixed. Abolitionists enthusiastically supported the measure while conservatives demanded Frémont's removal. Seeking to reverse Frémont's actions and maintain political balance, Lincoln eventually ordered Frémont to rescind the edict on September 11, 1861. Lincoln then sent various government officials to Missouri to build a case for Frémont's removal founded on Frémont's alleged incompetence rather than his abolitionist views. On these grounds, Lincoln sent an order on October 22, 1861, removing Frémont from command of the Department of the West. Although Lincoln opposed Frémont's method of emancipation, the episode had a significant impact on Lincoln, shaping his opinions on the appropriate steps towards emancipation and eventually leading, sixteen months later, to Lincoln's own Emancipation Proclamation.

== Background ==
=== Frémont ===
Born in Savannah, Georgia, in 1813, John Charles Frémont would become one of the nation's leading antislavery politicians in the 1850s. Frémont was granted a second lieutenant's commission in the U.S. Army's Bureau of Topographical Engineers in 1838, primarily through the support of Secretary of War Joel Poinsett. As a young army officer, Frémont took part in several exploratory expeditions of the American West in the 1840s. For his success in mapping a route across the Rocky Mountains to then Mexican California via the Oregon Trail, Frémont earned the nickname, "the Pathfinder" and attained the status of a national hero. During the Mexican–American War (1846–1848), Major Frémont took command of the Californian revolt of American settlers against Mexico and was appointed military governor of California in 1847. Frémont's independent actions ran at cross-purposes with the senior U.S. Army officer in California during the Mexican War—Stephen Watts Kearny. Frémont was arrested, brought to Washington, D.C. for a court-martial and resigned from the Army in 1848. Returning to the Pacific coast, Frémont became one of the first senators from California when it was granted statehood in 1850. In 1856, Frémont became the first Presidential candidate of the new Republican Party which established a platform advocating the limitation of slavery to those states in which it already existed. Frémont won 33 percent of the popular vote, but lost to Democratic Party candidate James Buchanan.

At the onset of the Civil War in April 1861, Frémont sought to resume his service in the Regular Army and was commissioned major general, becoming the third highest ranking general in the U.S. Army (according to date of appointment), just behind Maj. Gen. George B. McClellan. Frémont was placed in command of the Department of the West which included all states and territories between the Mississippi River and the Rockies as well as the state of Illinois and the western part of Kentucky. The department was headquartered in St. Louis, Missouri. Frémont arrived there and assumed command on July 25, 1861. His chief task was to establish control within the state of Missouri.

=== Missouri ===
At the commencement of the Civil War, Missouri was a deeply divided state. Missouri had chosen to remain in the Union, and initially maintained a policy of neutrality towards both the Union and the Confederacy. However, Missouri was also a state in which slavery was still legal, a factor which generated sympathy for the Confederacy and secession. The governor of Missouri at the start of the war, Claiborne Jackson, was in favor of secession and attempted to use the Missouri State Militia to resist the build-up of Union forces in his state.

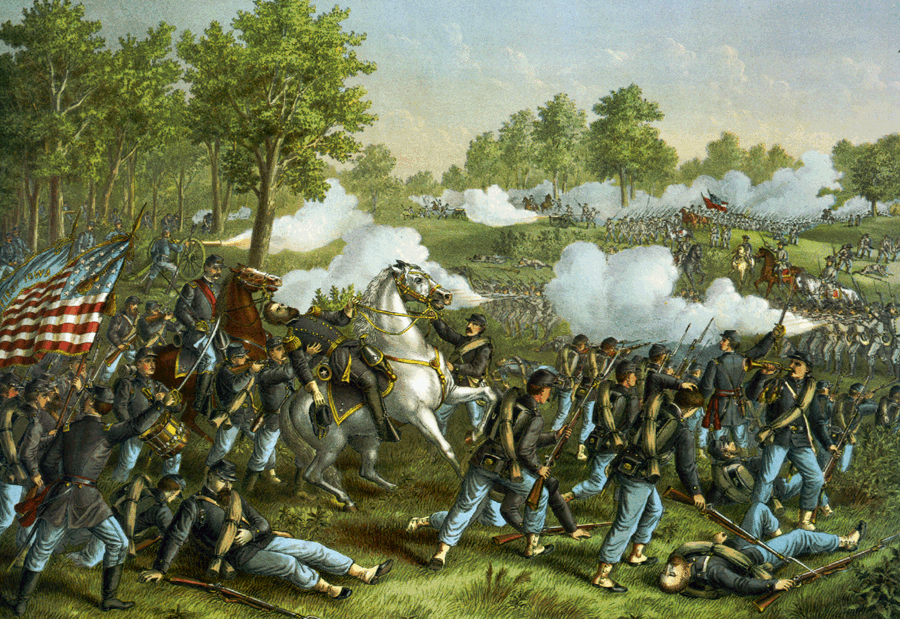
Death of Brig. Gen. Lyon during the Battle of Wilson's Creek.

Before Frémont, two generals had previously served as head of the Department of the West during the first four months of the war. Brigadier General William S. Harney had taken a diplomatic approach in Missouri, attempting to respect Missouri's neutrality through the Price-Harney Truce, negotiated with Sterling Price, commander of the Missouri State Militia. The truce was unacceptable to many Unionists and particularly to President Lincoln, as continued neutrality in Missouri would result in the state's refusal to supply men for the Union army. Harney was removed on May 30 and replaced with the hard-line Radical Republican Brig. Gen. Nathaniel Lyon. Earlier, while still a subordinate of Harney's, Lyon had raised tensions in Missouri to a fever-pitch by acting independently and capturing a portion of the Missouri State Militia during the Camp Jackson Affair on May 10, 1861. Although the maneuver eliminated a threat to the St. Louis Arsenal, it also caused a riot in St. Louis. As commander of the Department of the West, Lyon met with Gov. Jackson and informed him that, "rather than concede to the State of Missouri for one single instant the right to dictate to my government in any matter...I would see you...and every man and woman and child in the State dead and buried." After this, open warfare commenced between pro-Confederate militia and Union forces in Missouri. Gov. Jackson fled St. Louis, and the Missouri State Militia was re-organized to become the Missouri State Guard—a pro-secession force under the command of Sterling Price and Governor-in-Exile Jackson.

By the time Frémont took command in St. Louis on July 25, 1861, Union forces under Lyon had fought in several engagements against the Missouri State Guard. On August 10, a combined force of Missouri State Guard, Confederate States Army, and Arkansas Militia, consisting of about 11,000 troops, closed in on Lyon's Union force numbering approximately 5,000 near Springfield, Missouri. During the ensuing Battle of Wilson's Creek, Lyon was killed and the federal force routed. Pro-secession sentiment surged throughout Missouri following the Battle of Wilson's Creek. Estimates by Union army officials placed the number of armed secessionists in Missouri at roughly 60,000. Alarmed by the increasing turbulence, Frémont declared martial law in the state of Missouri on August 30, 1861.

== Proclamation and reaction ==
Just before dawn on August 30, Frémont finished penning his proclamation of martial law and read it to his wife and a trusted advisor, Edward Davis of Philadelphia. Davis warned that officials in Washington would never stand for such a sweeping edict. Frémont responded that he had been given full power to put down secession in Missouri and that, as a war measure, the proclamation was entirely warranted.

The most controversial passage of the proclamation, and the one with the greatest political consequences, was the following:

All persons who shall be taken with arms in their hands within these lines shall be tried by court-martial, and, if found guilty, will be shot. The property, real and personal, of all persons in the State of Missouri who shall take up arms against the United States, and who shall be directly proven to have taken active part with their enemies in the field, is declared to be confiscated to the public use; and their slaves, if any they have, are hereby declared free.

These measures threatened to alienate Unionists in other border states. Also, Frémont declared capital punishment would be administered to any secessionists bearing arms north of a line from Cape Girardeau, Missouri, to Leavenworth, Kansas. Frémont issued his proclamation without consulting any authority in Missouri or Washington.

The proclamation freed very few slaves. First, and most prominently, two slaves belonging to an aide of the former Gov. Jackson, Frank Lewis and Hiram Reed, were given their manumission papers. This act received significant coverage by the St. Louis press. Frémont then issued papers to 21 other slaves. However, the greatest significance of the proclamation was its political ramifications. The proclamation set a political precedent, over which there was tremendous disagreement, whether a Union general had any basis of authority to emancipate slaves. This threatened to tip the delicate political balance in border states. Missouri, Kentucky, and Maryland all might have been pushed towards secession if such a precedent had been backed by the federal government at the beginning of the war.

Unionists in Missouri were divided in their reaction. Radical Republicans, who favored abolition, were overjoyed. This included much of the St. Louis press. Frémont had surrounded himself with men of this faction, and several Radical Republican politicians had come to St. Louis with him as aides and advisors. These included US Representatives Owen Lovejoy (Illinois; brother of the antislavery journalist Elijah Lovejoy who had been murdered in 1837 by an anti-abolitionist mob), John A. Gurley (Ohio), and John P. C. Shanks (Indiana). All ardent abolitionists, these men encouraged and influenced Frémont's proclamation. More moderate Unionists were troubled by Frémont's proclamation and pro-slavery conservatives were outraged. Most important, among the moderates in Missouri alienated by Frémont's proclamation was the new governor of Missouri, Hamilton Rowan Gamble, whose authority Frémont had now superseded by declaring martial law. Feeling that Frémont had greatly overstepped his authority, Gamble began to work for Frémont's removal. In neighboring Kentucky, there was widespread outrage. Although the proclamation pertained only to the state of Missouri, Kentuckians feared that a similar edict might be applied by Frémont to their state. Most slaves in Kentucky belonged to Unionists and threatening to free them could have pushed the state into the Confederacy.

== Lincoln's reaction and Frémont's removal ==
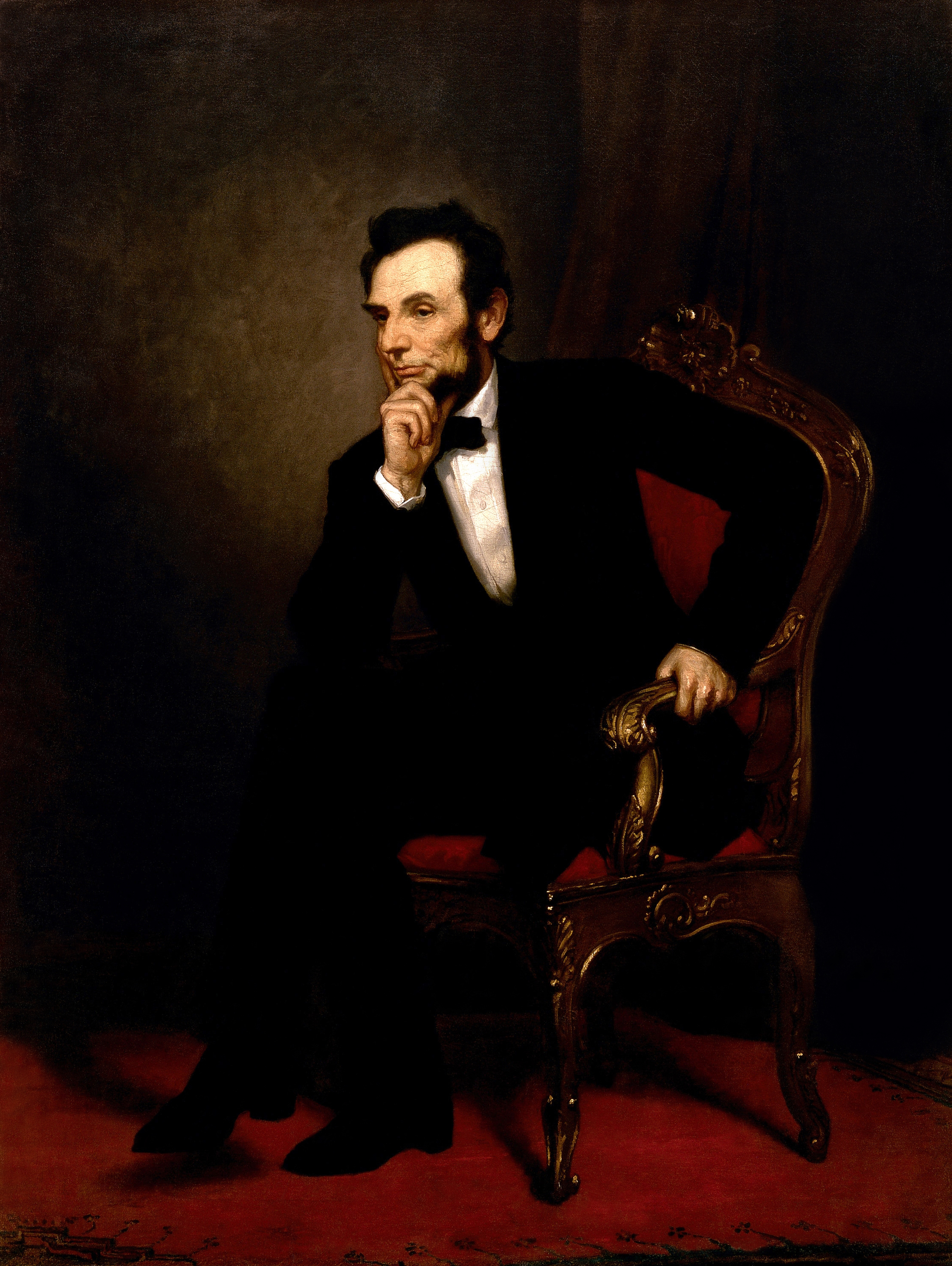
President Abraham Lincoln

President Lincoln learned of Frémont's proclamation by reading it in the newspaper. Disturbed by Frémont's actions, Lincoln felt that emancipation was "not within the range of military law or necessity" and that such powers rested only with the elected federal government. Lincoln also recognized the monumental political problem that such an edict posed to his efforts to keep the border states in the Union. He was particularly worried about reports he heard of the furor in Kentucky over the edict, writing, "I think to lose Kentucky is nearly the same as to lose the whole game." According to Lincoln in a letter to a supporter of Frémont, a unit of Kentucky militia fighting for the Union, upon hearing of Frémont's proclamation, threw down their weapons and disbanded. Lincoln determined the proclamation could not be allowed to remain in force. However, to override the edict or to directly order Frémont to strike out or modify the paragraph had its own political dangers—such an act would outrage abolitionists throughout the North. Sensitive to the political pitfalls on all sides, Lincoln wrote to Frémont, "Allow me to therefore ask, that you will, as of your own motion, modify that paragraph..."

Frémont wrote a reply to Lincoln's request on September 8, 1861, and sent it to Washington in the hands of his wife, Jessie Benton Frémont, who met with the President in the White House on September 10. In the letter, Frémont stated that he knew the situation in Missouri better than the President and that he would not rescind the proclamation unless directly ordered. Angered, Lincoln wrote Frémont the next day, directly ordering him to modify the emancipation clause to conform with existing federal law—that only slaves themselves acting in armed rebellion could be confiscated and freed.

Lincoln could not allow Frémont's insubordination to go unpunished. However, his dilemma again lay in politics. Removal of Frémont over the emancipation issue would infuriate radicals in Congress. Lincoln determined that if Frémont were to be removed, it would have to be for matters unrelated to the proclamation. He therefore sent Postmaster General Montgomery Blair and Quartermaster General Montgomery C. Meigs to Missouri to evaluate Frémont's management of his department. On his return, Blair reported that a tremendous state of disorganization existed in Missouri and Frémont "seemed stupified...and is doing absolutely nothing." When Adjutant General Lorenzo Thomas made his own inspection and reported to Lincoln that Frémont was, "wholly incompetent," Lincoln decided to leak Thomas's report to the press. Amidst the resulting public outrage against Frémont, Lincoln sent an order on October 22, 1861, removing him from command of the Department of the West.

== Aftermath ==
For Frémont, the personal repercussions of his proclamation were disastrous. His removal from command of the Western Department did irreparable damage to his reputation. Giving Frémont a second chance, Lincoln approved his appointment to command the strategically important Mountain Department, overseeing the mountainous region surrounding the Virginia and Kentucky border. Frémont's forces were badly defeated, however, in the Battle of Cross Keys in Virginia on June 8, 1862. He eventually resigned from frustration at being passed over when Lincoln appointed Maj. Gen. John Pope to command of the Army of Virginia, and spent the rest of the war awaiting a new appointment which never came.

For Lincoln, the immediate effects of Frémont's removal resulted in the furor the president had anticipated from northern abolitionists. Massachusetts Governor John Albion Andrew, a Radical Republican and abolitionist, wrote that Lincoln's actions had a "chilling influence" on the antislavery movement. The outrage was only a short-term effect, however, and soon subsided.

The most significant long-term consequence of the Frémont Emancipation was the effect it had on Lincoln's perceptions of emancipation and, specifically, how it should be accomplished. As historian Allen Guelzo describes, Lincoln became determined, after Frémont's failed proclamation, that emancipation could not be a matter of martial law or some other temporary measure that would later be challenged in courts. To ensure its permanence, Lincoln felt, emancipation would have to be put into effect by the federal government in a manner that was incontrovertibly constitutional. Equally important, the timing of emancipation would need to be orchestrated carefully, so as not to interfere with the war effort. In 1861, Lincoln had not yet espoused the idea of immediate emancipation and still hoped to work with state governments to accomplish gradual and perhaps even a compensated emancipation. The Frémont incident solidified Lincoln's belief that emancipation was the President's responsibility and could not be accomplished by scattered decrees from Union generals. This realization was one of several factors that led to Lincoln's own Emancipation Proclamation in September 1862.

== See also ==
- Missouri in the American Civil War
