= The Agony and the Ecstasy (film) =

1965 film by Carol Reed

- Theatrical release poster by Howard Terpning
- Directed by: Carol Reed
- Screenplay by: Philip Dunne
- Based on: The Agony and the Ecstasy; 1961 novel by Irving Stone
- Produced by: Carol Reed
- Starring: Charlton Heston; Rex Harrison; Diane Cilento; Harry Andrews; Alberto Lupo
- Cinematography: Leon Shamroy
- Edited by: Samuel E. Beetley
- Music by: Jerry Goldsmith; Alex North
- Production company: International Classics
- Distributed by: 20th Century Fox
- Release date: October 7, 1965
- Running time: 138 minutes
- Country: United States
- Language: English
- Budget: $7 million
- Box office: $8 million

The Agony and the Ecstasy is a 1965 American historical drama film directed by Carol Reed and starring Charlton Heston as Michelangelo and Rex Harrison as Pope Julius II. The film was partly based on Irving Stone's 1961 biographical novel of the same name, and deals with the conflicts of Michelangelo and Pope Julius II during the 1508–1512 painting of the Sistine Chapel ceiling. It also features a soundtrack by prolific composers Alex North and Jerry Goldsmith.

The film was shot in Todd-AO and Cinemascope versions. The Todd-AO version was used for the DVD release because of its superior picture quality.

== Plot ==
The film opens in documentary style, chronicling the work of Michelangelo Buonarroti. It then follows Michelangelo, a renowned Cinquecento sculptor of the Republic of Florence, in the early 16th century, and shows him at work on large-scale sculptures near St. Peter's Basilica. When Pope Julius II commissions him to paint the Sistine Chapel, Michelangelo resists because he finds the ceiling's paneled layout of the Twelve Apostles uninspiring. Nonetheless, he is forced into taking the job. During the initial attempt, Michelangelo is discontented with the results, and destroys the frescoes. He flees to Carrara, and then into the mountains where he finds inspiration from nature and Genesis.

Michelangelo returns and is allowed to paint the entire vault in a variety of newly designed biblical scenes based on the Book of Genesis, which the Pope approves. The work proceeds nonstop, even with Mass in session. Michelangelo faces opposition and criticism from the Pope's cardinals, due to its depictions of nudity in the paintings and its difference from common Greek style. As months turn to years, Michelangelo's work is threatened when he collapses due to fatigue. He is nursed back to health by Contessina de' Medici, daughter of his old friend Lorenzo de' Medici. After recovering, Michelangelo returns to work after learning he is at risk of being replaced by Raphael, whom the Pope commissions to paint the reception rooms of the Papal palace.

Meanwhile, the Papal States are threatened during the War of the League of Cambrai. Preparing for battle and having reached the limits of his patience, the Pope terminates Michelangelo's contract, and has the scaffolding torn down. Raphael, impressed with the work in progress, asks Michelangelo to show humility and finish the ceiling. Michelangelo travels to see the injured and weakened Pope, and pleads for him to restore the patronage. Though the Pope believes an invasion of Rome is inevitable, he raises the money needed to resume work on the ceiling.

One night, Michelangelo finds the ailing Pope inspecting the portrait of God in The Creation of Adam, which the Pope declares "a proof of faith" yet doubts Michelangelo's conception of God as merciful and Adam as innocent, then the Pope collapses and becomes bedridden. Though everyone assumes that the Pope will die, Michelangelo goads him into having the will to live and to finish his work and asks permission to allow him return to Florence, a request the Pope refuses. As Michelangelo leaves, the Pope recovers and upon seeing the cardinals and the monks, as well the choir, he angrily shooes them away. The tide of war turns in favor of the Papal States, as allies (including England and Spain) pledge to assist the Pope.

A Mass is held in which the congregation is shown the completed ceiling, to a positive response. After the ceremony, Michelangelo asks to begin carving the Pope's tomb. Realizing he has a short time to live, the Pope agrees but changes his mind when he gives Michelangelo another commission to paint a new fresco behind the altarpiece to replace the dilapidated ones (and gives Michelangelo the choice of subject like the crucifixion or the last judgment). The Pope then admits that Michelangelo's conception of God is accurate before goading him to continue his work. As the Pope leaves, Michelangelo turns back to look at the space behind the altarpiece, where he will later paint his Last Judgement 25 years later.

== Cast ==
- Charlton Heston as Michelangelo Buonarroti
- Rex Harrison as Pope Julius II
- Diane Cilento as Contessina Antonia Romola de' Medici
- Harry Andrews as Donato Bramante
- Alberto Lupo as Duke of Urbino
- Adolfo Celi as Giovanni de' Medici
- Venantino Venantini as Paris De Grassis
- John Stacy as Giuliano da Sangallo
- Fausto Tozzi as Foreman
- Maxine Audley as Woman
- Tomas Milian as Raphael

== Production ==
=== Development ===
Film rights to the novel were bought by 20th Century Fox for a reported $125,000. The head of the studio was Peter Levathes, and Burt Lancaster was linked to the film. In 1962, Fox almost collapsed due to cost over-runs on a number of films, notably Cleopatra. This resulted in Darryl F. Zanuck returning to run the studio. He installed his son Richard D. Zanuck as head of production.

In January 1963, Richard Zanuck signed Philip Dunne to write the script. Dunne later said he regarded his script as an original "because I used nothing of the book at all. My idea was not one man but two, the Pope and the artist. I called it Quirt and Flagg in the Sistine Chapel."

In October 1963, Zanuck announced the film would be one of six "roadshow" movies the company would make over the next 12 months, worth $42 million all up. The others would be The Day Custer Fell (turned into Custer of the West), Those Magnificent Men in Their Flying Machines, Justine, The Sound of Music and The Sand Pebbles. In October 1963, Charlton Heston signed to play the lead. On October 9 he wrote in his journal:

The Michelangelo script strikes me as possibly the best written that’s ever been submitted to me. It would be a different part for me, and might be a helluva movie, though whether it can work commercially, I don’t know. It seems too good a script for that, frankly.

The role of the Pope was offered to Laurence Olivier who was not available. Fox wanted Rex Harrison to co star and Heston wanted Fred Zinnemann to direct. Zinnemann turned down the film and Guy Green was considered. In November Harrison agreed to make the film. The same monnth, Luchino Visconti said he was considering an offer to direct the movie.

The studio then approached Carol Reed, who Heston had considered to direct The War Lord. By January, it was announced Reed would direct. Heston wrote, "This is good, I’m sure. We have a chance for a superior film with him; he confers class on the whole project." He met with Reed and was impressed by the desire of the director to push for rehearsal time writing on January 14, "We have to find a way to keep them from being simply a series of quarrels... So far this one smells ok. At least we have a good script."

=== Shooting ===
The film's production schedule ran from June 1964 to September 1964. When it came time to film the feature, the Sistine Chapel could not be used, and it was recreated on a sound stage at Cinecittà Studios in Rome.

In June, Heston wrote in his memoirs "I feel I’m learning a great deal from" Carol Reed but felt Harrison "will not be an easy man to work with. Perhaps he's insecure over who has the best part."

Rex Harrison later wrote in his memoirs:

I don’t think Carol was himself. I think Charlton Heston was absolutely himself, and by the end I didn’t know who I was... Heston very politely and very nicely made me feel that it was extremely kind of me to be supporting him. Carol did little to disabuse him of this notion, so I did everything I could to make myself believe that the picture was about Pope Julius rather than about Michelangelo.

Harrison admitted he wore lifts in his shoes to make himself seem taller than Heston but Heston then started wearing lifts in his shoes. In a later volume of memoirs, Harrison called the movie "an altogether horrendous experience for me" writing that the character he played had potential, "he was a most un-Popelike Pope, a Renaissance bull of a man, fighting duels, siring illegitimate children - but I felt like saying I was a pretty good, naturalistic stage actor, rather than a ham film star, and shouldn't have undertaken so ridiculous a project as this film... I nearly went mad from boredom and frustration."

Harrison felt Reed had greatly changed from when they made Night Train to Munich together "when he had a great sense of humour and was fun to work with. In this instance I found him doggedly trying to please the front office and Charlton Heston, who, I felt, was altogether too wooden to play this great artist." Heston wrote in his memoirs that he greatly admired Rex's performance, saying "I can't imagine a better performance, not Olivier, not anybody."

According to Heston, filming fell behind schedule because of the time taken by cinematographer Leon Shamroy.

== Release ==
On 26 March Heston attended a preview of the film in Minneapolis which he called "far and away the best sneak preview response of any film I’ve ever been in. The audience stamped and screamed and gave us an ovation at the end... I have absolutely no explanation for this, especially since the film had only a modest commercial success."

=== Box office ===
The film grossed around $4,000,000 during its US theatrical run in 1965. It later went on to make about $8,166,000 worldwide in rentals.

In September 1970 Fox estimated the film needed to make $17,800,000 in rentals to break even, and had made $8,166,000 world wide and had thus lost the studio $5,281,000. According to Heston, however, the film did eventually go into profit.

=== Critical reception ===
On the review aggregator website Rotten Tomatoes, 86% of 7 critics' reviews are positive, with an average rating of 6.6/10. Heston was surprised at the mixed notices the film received, writing "I'm good in the film. If it doesn't register there's something bloody wrong somewhere."

Bosley Crowther of The New York Times felt the film was, "not a strong and soaring drama but an illustrated lecture on a slow artist at work." He sympathized with the Pope and his mounting impatience with Michelangelo, criticizing Heston's acting as lacking any warmth to endear him to the audience. Furthermore, he believed the script suffered from being "wordy."

Heston wrote in 1995 "I still like Agony, I'm still proud of what I did in it. It’s not easy to find your way into a man like Michelangelo."

=== Accolades ===
The film was nominated for five Academy Awards:

- Best Art Direction, color (John DeCuir, Jack Martin Smith, and Dario Simoni)
- Best Cinematography, color (Leon Shamroy)
- Best Costume Design, color (Vittorio Nino Novarese)
- Best Original Score (Alex North)
- Best Sound (James Corcoran)

It was nominated for two Golden Globe Awards:

- Best Actor (Rex Harrison)
- Best Screenplay (Philip Dunne)

It won two awards from the National Board of Review:

- Best Supporting Actor (Harry Andrews)
- One of the Year's 10 Best

It won the Best Foreign Film at the David di Donatello Awards.

== See also ==
- List of American films of 1965

== Notes ==
- Heston, Charlton (1979). The Actor's Life: Journals, 1956-1976. Pocket Books. ISBN 9780525050308 – via Internet Archive.
- Heston, Charlton (1995). In the Arena: An Autobiography. Simon & Schuster. ISBN 9780684803944 – via Internet Archive.
