= The Agony and the Ecstasy (novel) =

1961 novel by Irving Stone

- First edition
- Author: Irving Stone
- Language: English
- Genre: Biographical, historical novel
- Publisher: Doubleday
- Publication date: March 17, 1961
- Publication place: United States
- ISBN: 0-451-21323-8
- OCLC: 56555113

The Agony and the Ecstasy (1961) is a biographical novel of Michelangelo Buonarroti written by American author Irving Stone. Stone lived in Italy for years visiting many of the locations in Rome and Florence, worked in marble quarries, and apprenticed himself to a marble sculptor. A primary source for the novel is Michelangelo's correspondence, all 495 letters of which Stone had translated from Italian by Charles Speroni and published in 1962 as I, Michelangelo, Sculptor. Stone also collaborated with Canadian sculptor Stanley Lewis, who researched Michelangelo's carving technique and tools. The Italian government lauded Stone with several honorary awards for his cultural achievements highlighting Italian history.

Stone wrote a dozen biographical novels, but this one and Lust for Life (1934) are best known, in large part because both had major Hollywood film adaptations.

Part of the 1961 novel was adapted to film in The Agony and the Ecstasy (1965), starring Charlton Heston as Michelangelo and Rex Harrison as Pope Julius II.

== Plot ==
=== Sections ===
The book is divided into eleven sections, each detailing a distinct period of Michelangelo's life.

1. The Studio: Michelangelo studies under Ghirlandaio at his studio
2. The Sculpture Garden: Michelangelo studies under Bertoldo in the sculpture garden of Lorenzo de' Medici, culminating in his first sculpture, Head of a Faun
3. The Palace: Michelangelo lives in the palace of Lorenzo de' Medici, where he befriends Lorenzo's daughter Contessina, learns from Bertoldo and the Platonic scholars, and produces his first two reliefs, Madonna of the Steps and Battle of the Centaurs. Savonarola turns Florence against the Medici family, and ultimately Lorenzo passes away from illness.
4. The Flight: Michelangelo returns to his parents' home. He begins dissecting bodies at Santo Spirito to further his understanding of the human form while starting work on a sculpture of Hercules in memory of Lorenzo, as well as a Crucifix for the church. He is invited to live at the Medici palace once more by Piero de' Medici, but when the people of Florence become disenchanted by the lavishness of Contessina's wedding celebrations Savonarola turns the city against the Medici family and the palace is attacked. Michelangelo flees to Bologna, where he stays with Aldovrandi, becomes romantically involved with a woman named Clarissa, and creates the sculptures St. Proclus and St. Petronius. He returns to Florence once the political situation has calmed and is commissioned to create a sculpture of a young St. John the Baptist and a counterfeit Cupid. The fraudulence of the Cupid is discovered by its ultimate owner, Cardinal Raffaele Riario, who is nevertheless impressed and invites Michelangelo to live in Rome for a time to sculpt something new.
5. The City: Michelangelo travels to Rome and stays at the palace of Cardinal Riario, then at the home of his new friend Jacopo Galli, and finally in his own studio with his new apprentice Argiento. While in Rome he sculpts his Bacchus and his Pietà, and then he returns to Florence with Argiento to enter a sculpting competition.
6. The Giant: Michelangelo wins the Duccio competition by sculpting his David and competes with Leonardo da Vinci by painting the Battle of Cascina, and is then summoned to Rome by Pope Julius II.
7. The Pope: After resisting his summons by Pope Julius II for as long as possible, Michelangelo ultimately relents and returns to Rome. Michelangelo's and Julius' hot tempers cause tension, but ultimately Michelangelo is commissioned to carve Julius' tomb (which is repeatedly put on hold) and paint the Sistine Chapel ceiling.
8. The Medici: Upon Pope Julius II's passing, the new Pope Leo X pulls Michelangelo from his work on Julius' tomb to create a façade for the Medici family church in Florence. Michelangelo first travels to Carrara to buy marble, but is then instead tasked with creating roads and a quarry to mine marble from Pietrasanta. While he succeeds in this endeavor, his marble is used for other projects and Michelangelo, dejected, returns to Florence.
9. The War: While Michelangelo is living in Florence, Pope Leo dies and is replaced rapidly first by Adrian VI and then by Pope Clement VII. The Medici are ousted by the citizens of Florence who restore the republic, and Michelangelo assists in their defense against the pope by helping construct defensive walls. Although the city ultimately falls to papal forces and Michelangelo flees to Rome, he is nevertheless welcomed to Rome by Clement who wants to give him a new commission.
10. Love: Michelangelo paints The Last Judgment first for Clement and then, upon his passing, Pope Paul III. He also begins deep friendships with both Vittoria Colonna and Tommaso dei Cavalieri.
11. The Dome: Michelangelo finally finishes his tomb for Julius and is named architect of St. Peter's Basilica despite opposition from other architects and artists. With the help of Urbino and Tommaso the plans for the dome of the basilica are executed to such a degree that its completion is inevitable. Michelangelo's strength wanes and his friends visit him to say their goodbyes, while Tommaso vows to finish St. Peter's. Michelangelo passes away while reminiscing on his body of work.

=== Characters ===
- Buonarroti Family
  - Michelangelo Buonarroti, the protagonist
  - Ludovico, Michelangelo's father who is obsessively focused on money and his family's fortunes
  - Bugiardini, Michelangelo's brother who helps manage his money
  - Lionardo, Michelangelo's brother who joins the church and follows Savonarola
  - Giovansimone, Michelangelo's brother who becomes part of Savonarola's Army of Boys
- Michelangelo's Teachers
  - Ghirlandaio, Michelangelo's first master, a fresco painter who runs his own studio
  - Bertoldo, Michelangelo's master in sculpture, who lives and works with him in the Medici palace
- Michelangelo's Friends
  - Francesco Granacci, Michelangelo's first and closest friend
  - Gianfrancesco Aldovrandi, who hosts Michelangelo in Bologna
  - Giuliano da Sangallo, a Florentine architect
  - Jacopo Galli, a Roman banker who helps manage Michelangelo's finances
  - Argiento, an apprentice of Michelangelo's
  - Urbino, an apprentice of Michelangelo's for the last third of his life
  - Vittoria Colonna
  - Tommaso dei Cavalieri
- Medici Family
  - Lorenzo de' Medici, Michelangelo's first patron and surrogate father figure
  - Contessa de' Medici, Lorenzo's daughter and a close friend of Michelangelo
  - Piero de' Medici, Lorenzo's son and heir
- Church
  - Savonarola, a religious reformer who turns Florence against the Medici family
  - Nicola Bichiellini, the prior of Santo Spirito who opens the church to Michelangelo

== Works of art discussed in The Agony and the Ecstasy ==
=== Book One: The Studio ===
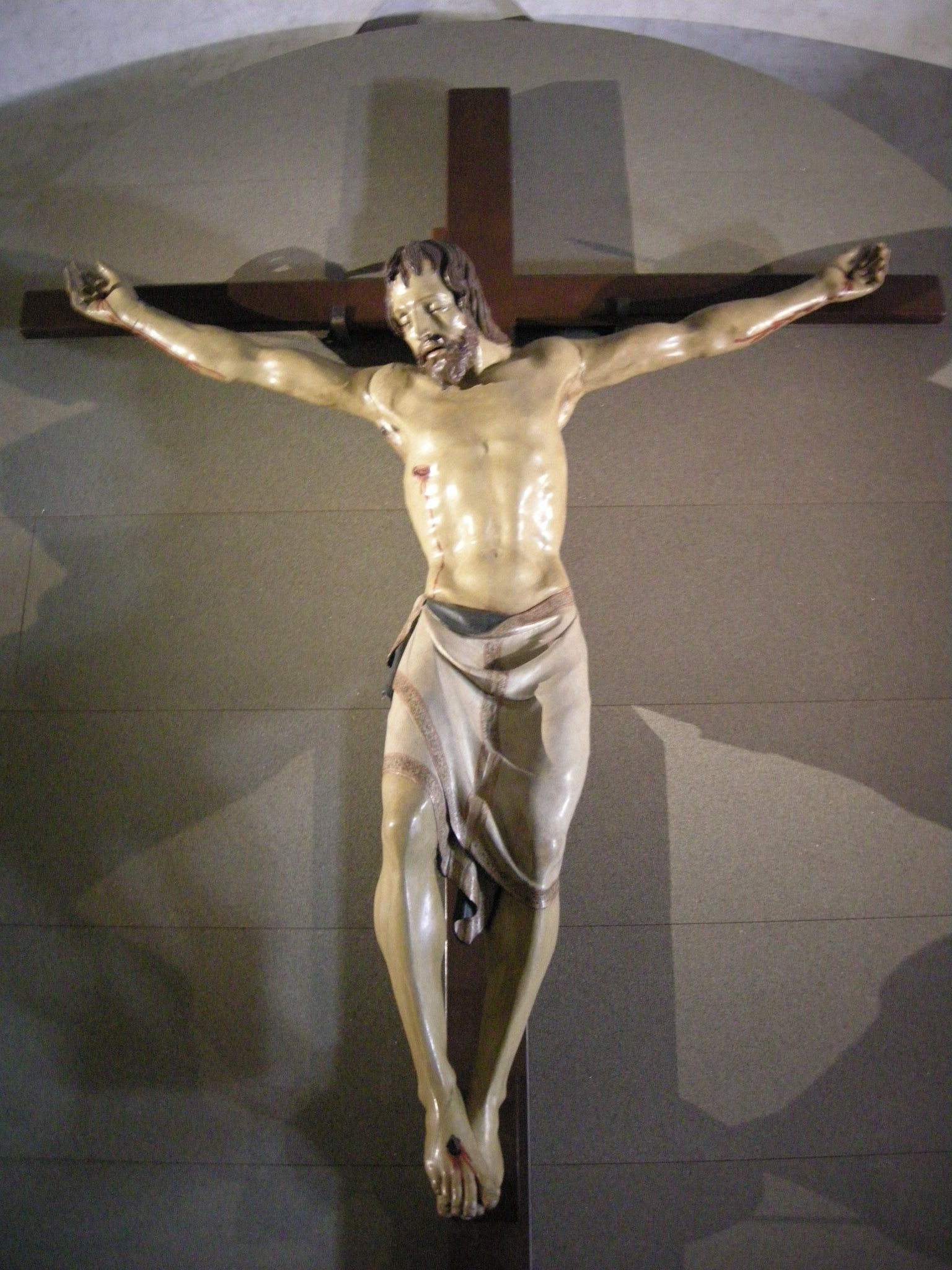
Wooden Crucifix at Santa Croce by Donatello, 1406–1408

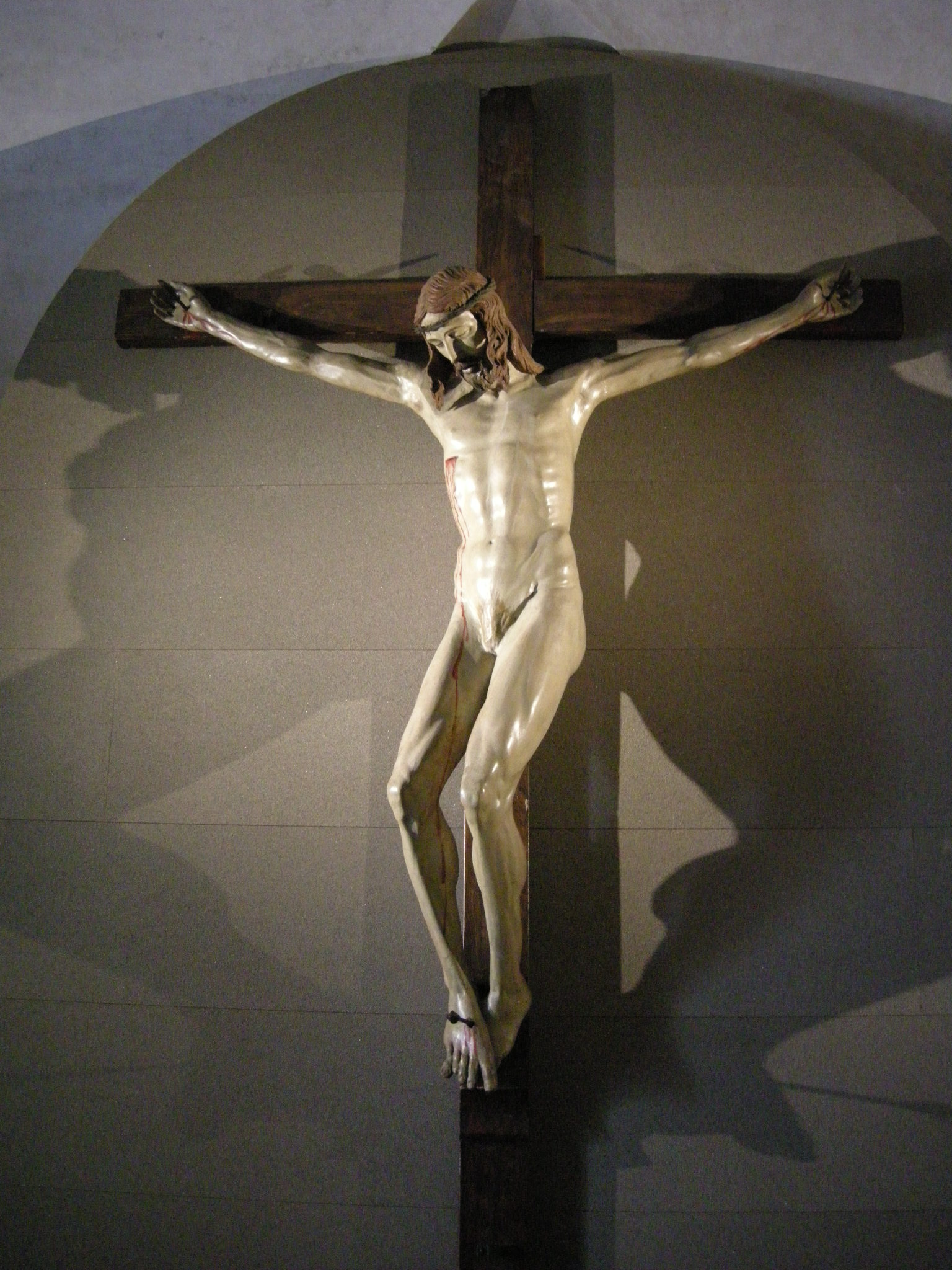
Wooden Crucifix at Santa Maria Novella by Brunelleschi, 1410–1415

==== Crucifixes of Donatello and Brunelleschi ====
After Ghirlandaio looks at Michelangelo’s sketches of Christ drawn with a stonemason as the model, he tells Michelangelo the story of Donatello showing his newly carved crucifix to Brunelleschi. Brunelleschi observes that it seems to him Donatello has, “put a plowman on the cross, rather than the body of Jesus Christ, which was most delicate in all its parts." Donatello, upset by his friend’s criticism, challenges Brunelleschi to make Christ’s figure himself. When Brunelleschi presents his own, newly finished crucifix, “Donatello, who could not take his eyes off the beautiful Christ, answered, ‘It is your work to make Christs, and mine to make plowmen.’” Michelangelo, familiar with both carvings, tells Ghirlandaio that he “preferred Donatello’s plowman to Brunelleschi’s ethereal Christ, which was so slight that it looked as though it had been created to be crucified. With Donatello’s figure, the crucifixion had come as a horrifying surprise….”

Ghirlandaio was currently working on the sketches for the Baptism of Christ, which was to be one of the scenes in the fresco of the Tornabuoni Choir. Though Ghirlandaio never mentions their conversation about the figure of Christ again, Michelangelo sees his preferred Christ in Ghirlandaio’s finished figure: “The legs twisted in an angular position, a little knock-kneed; the chest, shoulders and arms those of a man who had carried logs and built houses; with a rounded, protruding stomach that had absorbed its quantity of food: in its power and reality far outdistancing any of the still-life set figures that Ghirlandaio had as yet painted for the Tornabuoni Choir.” (From Book Two, but about the same painting) Michelangelo “sketched his roughhewn young contandino just in from the fields, naked except for his brache, kneeling to take off his clodhoppers; the flesh tones a sunburned amber, the figure clumsy, with graceless bumpkin muscles; but the face transfused with light as the young lad gazed up at John. Behind him, he did two white-bearded assistants to John, with beauty in their faces and a rugged power in their figures. He experimented with flesh tones from his paint pots, enjoyed this culminating physical effort of bringing his figures to life, clothing them in warm-colored lemon-yellow and rose robes.”

==== Other ====
- Michelangelo "watched Ghirlandaio complete a portrait of Giovanna Tournabouni"
- "Michelangelo .. was studying the pure gold sculptures of Ghiberti's second set of doors", famously describing them as "the gates of paradise"

== In popular culture ==
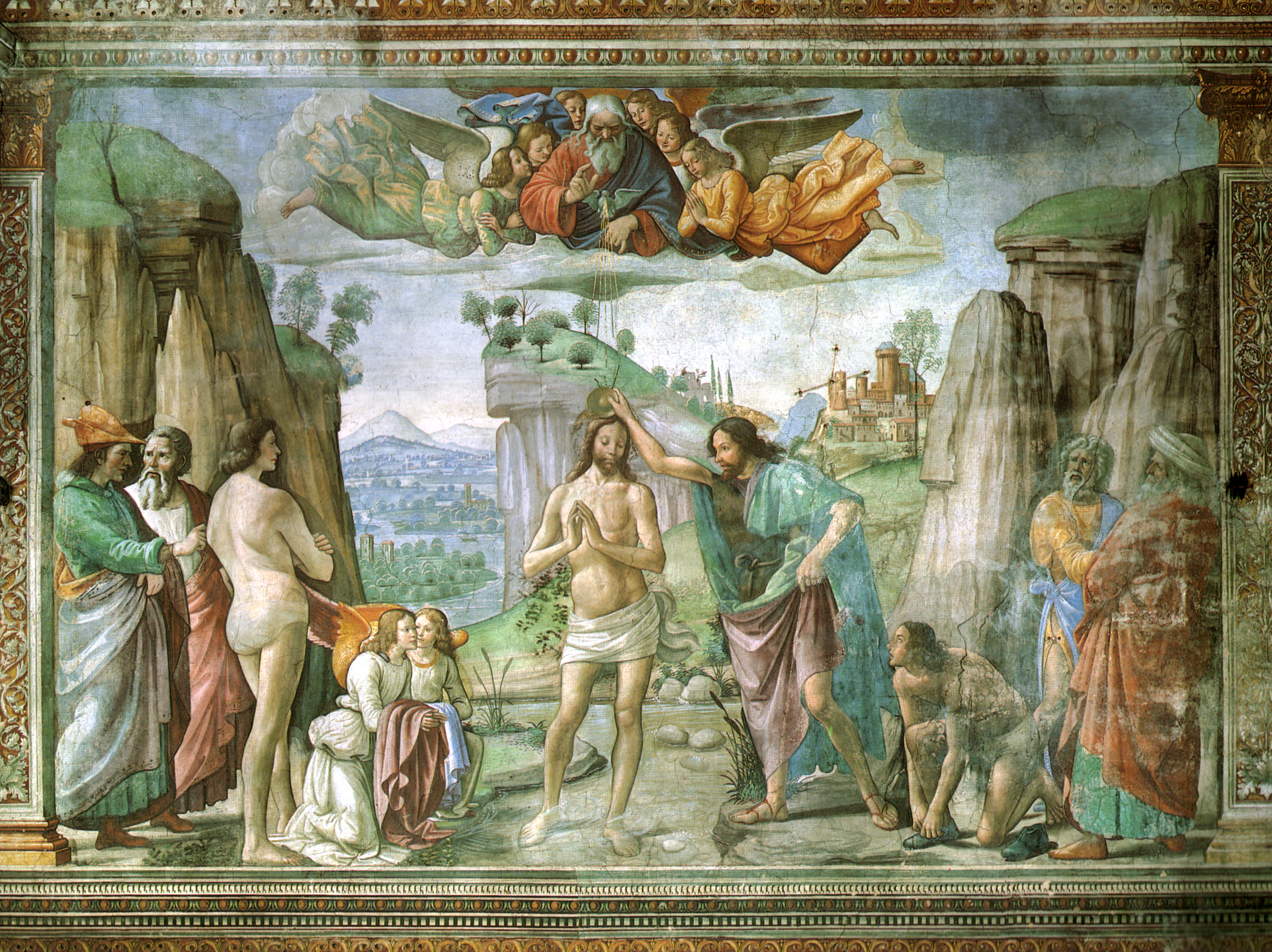
Baptism of Christ, Tornabuoni Chapel

- The book is mentioned in John Guare's 1990 play Six Degrees of Separation as a book Paul, the protagonist, had recently completed.
- In the 2008 Mad Men season 2 episode "Flight 1", Peggy Olson's mother tells her daughters: "I have to renew The Agony and the Ecstasy; it's taking forever".
- In the autobiographical adventure book Minus 148°, author Art Davidson mentions that he is reading The Agony and the Ecstasy while waiting out a blizzard on the first winter ascent of Denali.
