= Jessie Benton Frémont =

American politician and activist (1824–1902)

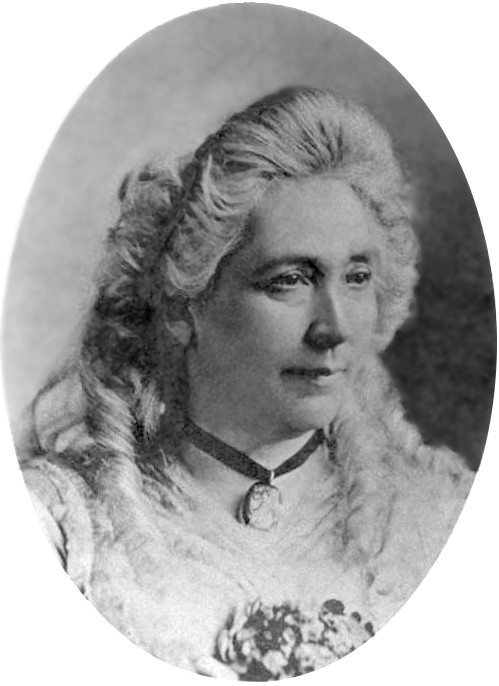
- Photo taken in 1876
- Born: Jessie Ann Benton; May 31, 1824; Rockbridge County, Virginia, U.S.
- Died: December 27, 1902 (aged 78); Los Angeles, California, U.S.
- Spouse: John C. Frémont
- Father: Thomas Hart Benton

Jessie Ann Benton Frémont (May 31, 1824 – December 27, 1902) was an American writer and political activist. She was the daughter of Missouri Senator Thomas Hart Benton and the wife of military officer, explorer, and politician John C. Frémont. She wrote stories for popular magazines and several books. Her writings, which helped sustain her family during financial hardship, primarily focused on memoirs of her experiences in the American West.

She was a staunch supporter of her husband, who served as one of the first two U.S. Senators representing California and as governor of the Territory of Arizona. She was outspoken on political matters and was an opponent of slavery, which was never implemented in California after the Union won the American Civil War.

== Early life and education ==
She was born near Lexington, Virginia, on May 31, 1824, the second child of Thomas Hart Benton (1782–1858) and Elizabeth McDowell (1794–1854). She was born at the residence of her maternal grandfather, James McDowell. Despite her father, Senator Benton, desiring a son, he named her in honor of his own father, Jesse Benton.

She was raised in Washington, D.C., in a manner more typical of a 19th-century son than a daughter. Her father, renowned as the "Great Expansionist," oversaw her early education and introduced her to the prominent politicians of the era, an uncommon practice for the time. Jessie formed a strong bond with her father and remained by his side. He shared with her the numerous books and maps from the valise that accompanied him on their journeys between Missouri and Virginia. She gradually began to adopt his vision of a nation stretching from ocean to ocean. Through this upbringing, she acquired a comprehensive education encompassing social structure and various disciplines such as politics, history, literature, and languages. After achieving fluency in French and Spanish, she contributed to the translation of government documents.

In 1840 at age 16, while studying and living at Georgetown Seminary, she met Lieutenant John C. Frémont who was in Washington, D.C., preparing a report on explorations (with Joseph Nicollet as commander) he had made between the Missouri River and the northern frontier of the United States. They became engaged, but her parents objected to a marriage at that time because of her age. Probably through the influence of Benton, Frémont then received an order from the Department of War to examine the Des Moines River on the western frontier. Shortly after their return they were married on October 19, 1841.

== Career ==
=== American West ===
For a while after their marriage, Jessie and her husband lived on Army posts, until Frémont was assigned the task of exploring the West and scouting land for future U.S. territorial expansion. It was this assignment that began the couple's rise to fame.

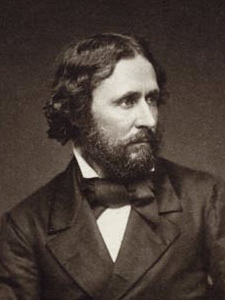
In 1841, Jessie married John C. Frémont, a U.S. Army officer

A reconciliation occurred between Jessie and her father when he promoted Frémont's famous explorations of the West. Senator Benton had been persuaded by his ailing wife to accept the marriage, and the couple moved into the Benton home. Frémont left his pregnant wife behind in the spring of 1842 to lead his first expedition to mark the trails West. He returned, however, days before the birth of their eldest child, Elizabeth Benton "Lily" Frémont, who was born November 15, 1842, in Washington D.C. He then headed off again, and Jessie and the baby remained behind.

Frémont became known as the "Pathfinder to the West", after James Fenimore Cooper's novel, the Pathfinder. Jessie, intensely interested in the details of his expedition, became his recorder, making notes as he described his experiences. Adding human-interest touches to these printed reports, she wrote and edited best-selling stories of the adventures Frémont had while exploring the West with his scout, Kit Carson. Thus, she involved herself in her most happy life's work, interpreting her husband and his actions for a public eager for information about the opening of the West. Written during a time when the concept of Manifest Destiny was becoming increasingly popular, these narratives were received with great enthusiasm.

Her husband was involved tangentially in the conquest of California, the annexation of which occurred as a result of the Mexican–American War. He served as the 3rd Military Governor, in 1847. At the time of the court-martial of Frémont, during which he attempted to defend his actions in the Bear Flag Revolt, Jessie gave birth to a son, Benton Frémont, on July 24, 1848, in Washington, D.C. The baby's death, within the year in St. Louis, she blamed on her husband's accuser, General Kearny.

In 1849, Jessie and Lily made a harrowing and treacherous journey aboard ship to join Frémont in California. After disembarking and crossing the Isthmus of Panama, they boarded another vessel to San Francisco. With income from their gold mines, the Frémonts established a home and settled into San Francisco society. As a politically informed woman, Jessie was known to get involved in city politics and discuss with the men any issues that were of importance at the time. She became a member of the Pacific Coast Women's Press Association.

== Political life ==
John C. Frémont served from September 9, 1850, to March 3, 1851, as a Senator from California. Their third child, John C. Frémont Jr., was born on April 19, 1851, while the couple was living at Las Mariposas, California, in present-day Mariposa County, California. In the town of Mariposa, Jessie Street is named for her, and John C. Fremont Hospital is named after her husband.

While the couple was visiting Paris, France, their fourth child, Anne Beverly Frémont, was born on February 1, 1853. Anne died five months later, on July 11, in Washington, D.C. Their fifth and final child, Francis Preston Frémont, was born on May 17, 1855, in Washington.

In 1856, Frémont's antislavery position was instrumental in his being chosen as the first-ever Republican candidate for President. Jessie played an extremely active role in the campaign, rallying support for her husband. One particular campaign slogan read, "Frémont and Jessie too." Her father, however, a lifelong Democrat, refused to endorse her husband's bid for the presidency. This did not stop the supporters of Frémont from continuing to refer to her as the "first lady in the land," a title her admirers continued to use throughout her life.

Frémont garnered many Northern votes but ultimately lost the election to James Buchanan, though he did surpass the American Party candidate, Millard Fillmore. Frémont was unable to carry the state of California.

In the years following, the couple moved several times, living in California, St. Louis, and New York. She played an active role in the anti-Secession movement in California in 1861 and enlisted both Unitarian minister Thomas Starr King and writer Bret Harte to her crusade. When Lincoln appointed Frémont as the Commander of the Department of the West in 1861, they returned to St. Louis.

Jessie Frémont served as her husband's unofficial aide and closest adviser. The two shared the belief that St. Louis was unprepared for war and needed reinforcements and supplies, and both pressured Washington to send more supplies and troops. She threw herself into the war effort, helping to organize a Soldier's Relief Society in St. Louis and becoming very active in the Western Sanitary Commission, which provided medicine and nursing to soldiers injured in the war.

A high point of her political career came when Frémont was about to lose his position during the Civil War after issuing his own edict of emancipation, which freed the slaves of armed and convicted Confederates in Missouri, predating Lincoln's own Emancipation Proclamation. The methods, timing, and political effects of this emancipation disturbed Lincoln and he sought to have it undone. Jessie traveled to Washington and pleaded with Lincoln on behalf of her husband, but to no avail.

== Later years ==
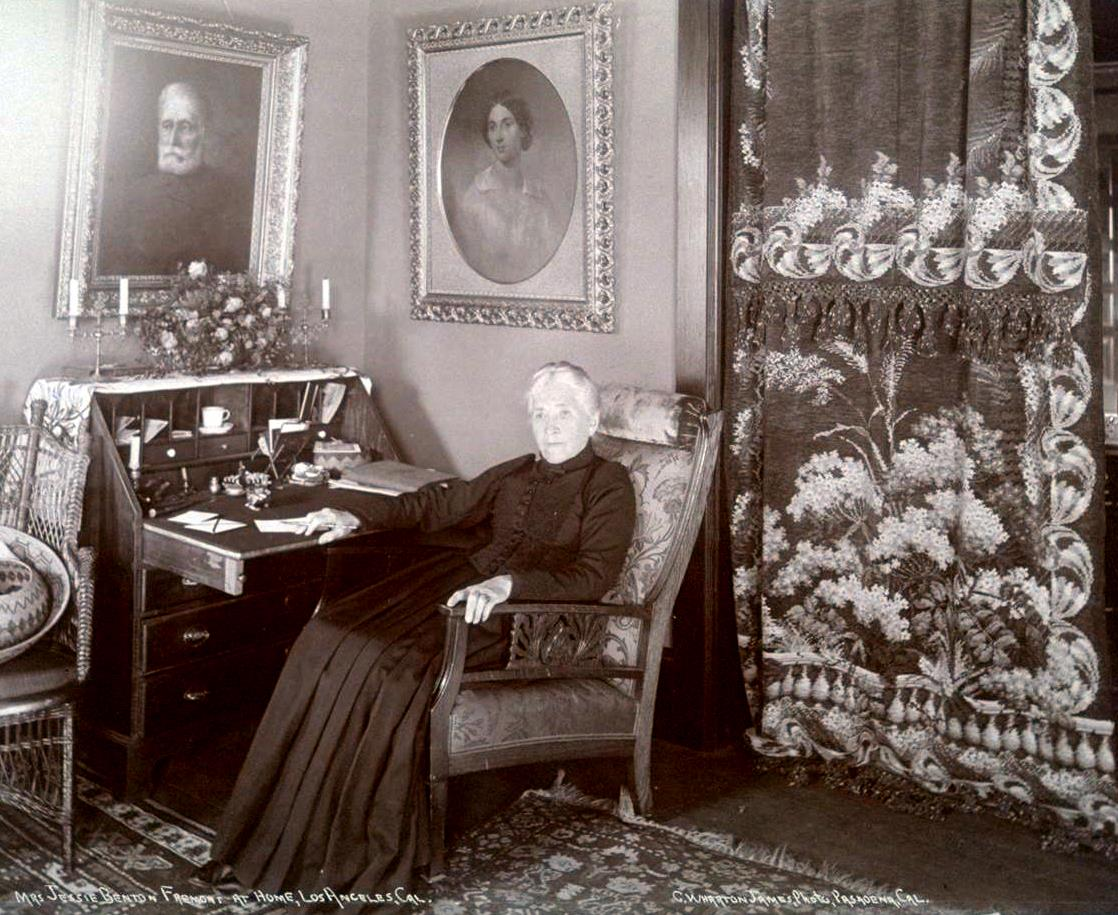
Frémont sitting at home in Los Angeles

The Frémonts would not live in St. Louis again, moving to New York and then California. In the Panic of 1873, John C. Frémont, who had invested heavily in railroad stock, lost everything and declared bankruptcy. Undaunted by their financial situation, Jessie began writing books to help support the family, namely A Year of American Travel: Narrative of Personal Experience (1878), a story about her journey to California in 1849, and Souvenirs of My Time (1887).

From 1878 to 1881, John C. Frémont served as Governor of the Territory of Arizona. Three months after being allowed to resign from the Army with pension, he died in 1890 in a hotel in New York.

After the death of her husband, the Congress, in recognition of his valued services, granted Jessie a widow's pension of $2,000 a year. In 1891, she moved into a home at the corner of 28th and Hoover Streets in Los Angeles that was presented to her by a committee of ladies of the city as a token of their great regard. She remained in good health until about two and a half years before her death when an accident made her an invalid, but she was able to use a wheelchair and enjoy the outdoors.

Jessie Benton Frémont died at age 78 at her home in Los Angeles. A huge box of fragrant and beautiful roses was sent on December 29, 1902, by Lucretia Garfield, a former first lady. The rites of the Episcopal Church were conducted at 10:30 a.m. on December 30, at Christ Church, on the corner of Pico and Flower streets. She was cremated, and her ashes interred in Rosedale Cemetery.

In 1960, actress Lorna Thayer was cast as Jessie Frémont in the episode, "The Gentle Sword" of the syndicated television anthology series, Death Valley Days. In the story line, the Frémonts, in California during the gold rush, become involved in a mining claim dispute; Mrs. Frémont stares down organized claim jumpers.

== Works ==
- The Story of the Guard: A Chronicle of the War (1863)
- A Year of American Travel: Narrative of Personal Experience (1878)
- Souvenirs of My Time (1887)
- Far-West Sketches (1890)
- The Will and the Way Stories (1891)
- The Origin of the Frémont Explorations (1891)

The book Memoirs of My Life (1887) by John C. Frémont includes Sketch of Senator Benton by Jessie Benton Frémont.

== Letters ==
- The letters of Jessie Benton Frémont (1993) edited by Pamela Herr and Mary Lee Spence, Urbana: University of Illinois Press.

Collection of 271 letters offering insights into the mind and heart of the author, across the span of her life, including her husband's presidential campaign, her role in the Civil War, her time as First Lady of the Territory of Arizona, and her impressions of the late 1800s in California.

== Biographies ==
- Jessie Fremont at Black Point (1974) by Lois Rather, Rather Press, Oakland CA
- Jessie Benton Frémont: A Biography (1987) by Pamela Herr
- Jessie Benton Frémont: A Woman who Made History (1995) by Catherine Coffin Phillips
- Jessie Benton Frémont: Missouri's Trailblazer (2005) by Ilene Stone and Suzanna M. Grenz
- Passion and Principle: John and Jessie Frémont, the Couple Whose Power, Politics, and Love Shaped Nineteenth-century America (2007) by Sally Denton
- Imperfect Union: How Jessie and John Fremont Mapped the West, Invented Celebrity and Helped Cause the Civil War, (2020) by Steve Inskeep, Penguin Press

=== In fiction ===
- Immortal Wife: The Biographical Novel of Jessie Benton Frémont (1944) by Irving Stone
- Phillips, Michael and Judith Pella. The Journals of Corrie Belle Hollister: On the Trail of the Truth Bethany House Pub., 1991.
- Dream West is a 1982 historical novel by David Nevin about Charles and Jessie Frémont, which was adapted into a 1986 miniseries of the same name.

== See also ==
- 1856 United States presidential election
- 1860 United States presidential election
- 1864 United States presidential election
