= Irving Stone =

American writer (1903–1989)

- Born: Irving Tennenbaum; July 14, 1903; San Francisco, California, U.S.
- Died: August 26, 1989 (aged 86); Los Angeles, California, U.S.
- Education: University of California, Berkeley (MA)
- Occupation: Writer
- Spouse(s): Lona Mosk (divorced); Jean Factor

Irving Stone (born Tennenbaum; July 14, 1903 – August 26, 1989) was an American writer, chiefly known for his biographical novels of noted artists, politicians, and intellectuals. Among the best known are Lust for Life (1934), about the life of Vincent van Gogh, and The Agony and the Ecstasy (1961), about Michelangelo.

== Biography ==
Born Irving Tennenbaum in San Francisco, he was seven when his parents divorced. By the time he was a senior in high school, his mother had remarried. He legally changed his last name to "Stone", his stepfather's surname. Stone said his mother instilled a passion for reading in him. From then on, he believed that education was the only way to succeed in life.

In 1923, Stone received his bachelor's degree from the University of California, Berkeley. After receiving his M.A. there, he worked as a teaching assistant in English. He met his first wife, Lona Mosk (1905–1965), who was a student at the university. On money provided by her father, Los Angeles businessman Ernest Mosk, the young couple went to Paris.

Irving and Lona Stone returned to the United States in the 1930s from Europe, where he had been researching Van Gogh for six months. In 1930 he received a letter from Dr. Felix Rey, who had treated Van Gogh after the artist cut off his own ear in December 1888. Rey, who was the subject of a portrait painting by Van Gogh, became Stone's friend; he confirmed that Van Gogh's whole ear was removed and not only the earlobe. As reported in the NY Times obituary of Stone on August 28, 1989, the Stones resided in New York's Greenwich Village where Irving finished Lust for Life, the biographical novel about Van Gogh that set his career in motion. According to the Times, Lust for Life (the title suggested by his first wife) was rejected by seventeen publishers over three years before being published in 1934.

Stone began a relationship with his secretary, Jean Factor, and after he and Lona were divorced, he and Jean married. This later marriage lasted until Stone's death in Los Angeles in 1989. Jean Stone died in 2004, aged 93.

During their years together, Jean Stone edited many of his books. The Stones lived primarily in Los Angeles. They funded a foundation to support a number of charitable causes.

When at home, Stone relied upon the research facilities and expertise made available to him by Esther Euler, chief research librarian at the University of California at Los Angeles. He dedicated books to her and thanked her in several of his works.

According to his afterword in Lust for Life, Stone relied on Van Gogh's letters to his brother, art dealer Theo. Stone additionally did much of his research "in the field." For example, he spent many years living in Italy while working on The Agony and the Ecstasy, a novel about Michelangelo Buonarroti. In his introduction to The Origin, Stone documents that he and his wife lived for a while at Down House (Darwin's home for the final forty years of his life) during the research and writing of that book. The Italian government lauded Stone with several honorary awards during this period for his cultural achievements highlighting Italian history.

== Non-fiction books ==
Although he was best known for his novels, Stone also wrote a number of non-fiction books. His biography of Clarence Darrow, Clarence Darrow For the Defense, about the attorney known both for his defense of thrill killers Leopold and Loeb and his defense of John T. Scopes in the 1925 Scopes "Monkey" Trial (the trial of a biology teacher who taught about evolution in Tennessee), was published in 1941. His biography Earl Warren, about the California governor and later Chief Justice of the United States, was published in 1948.

== Film adaptations ==
The 1941 film, Arkansas Judge, starring Roy Rogers, was based on Stone's 1940 novel False Witness.

In 1953, a popular film version was made of The President's Lady, based on Stone's 1951 novel of the same name, starring Charlton Heston as Andrew Jackson and Susan Hayward as Rachel Donelson Jackson.

In 1956, a film version was made of Lust for Life, based on his 1934 novel, starring Kirk Douglas as Van Gogh.

In 1965, a film was made of The Agony and the Ecstasy, starring Charlton Heston as Michelangelo and Rex Harrison as Pope Julius II.

Stone's 1975 book, The Greek Treasure, was the basis for the German television production Der geheimnisvolle Schatz von Troja (Hunt for Troy, 2007).

== Legacy and honors ==
- 1956 Spur Award (Nonfiction) for Men to Match My Mountains
- 1960 Honorary Doctorate of Letters from Berkeley, his alma mater.
- 1961 Commonwealth Club of California Book Awards (Fiction, Silver) for The Agony and the Ecstasy
- 1971 Golden Plate Award of the American Academy of Achievement

== Published works ==
=== Fiction ===
- Pageant of Youth (1933) - Irving Stone's first novel, focussing on student Ray Sharpe at the fictional Stockley University in California, but which, in essence, is a semi-autobiographical account of the author's own undergraduate experience at Berkeley
- Lust for Life (1934) – Historical novel based on the life of Vincent van Gogh
- Sailor on Horseback (1938) - Historical novel based on the life of Jack London
- False Witness (1940) - A novel set in a small farming community of Mission Valley, which inspired the 1941 movie Arkansas Judge starring Roy Rogers
- Immortal Wife (1944) – Historical novel based on the life of Jessie Benton Frémont
- Adversary in the House (1947) – Historical novel based on the life of Eugene V. Debs and his wife Kate, who opposed socialism
- The Passionate Journey (1949) – Historical novel based on the life of American artist John Noble
- The President's Lady (1951) – Historical novel based on the life of American president Andrew Jackson and his marriage to Rachel Donelson Jackson
- Love Is Eternal (1954) – Historical novel based on the marriage of Abraham Lincoln and Mary Todd
- The Agony and the Ecstasy – (1961) – Historical novel based on the life of Michelangelo
- Those Who Love (1965) – Historical novel based on the life of John Adams and Abigail Adams
- The Passions of the Mind (1971) – Historical novel based on the life of Sigmund Freud
- The Greek Treasure (1975) – Historical novel based on the discovery of Troy by Heinrich Schliemann and his wife Sophia
- The Origin (1980) – Historical novel based on the life of Charles Darwin
- Depths of Glory (1985) – Historical novel based on the life of Camille Pissarro

Lust for Life and Immortal Wife were published as Armed Services Editions during WWII.

=== Non-fiction ===
- Clarence Darrow For the Defense (1941) – biography of Clarence Darrow
- They Also Ran (1943, updated 1966) – analysis of candidates for U.S. president who were defeated
- Earl Warren (1948) – biography of Earl Warren
- Men to Match My Mountains (1956) – account of the opening of the American Old West, 1840–1900
