= Lust for Life (novel) =

1934 novel by Irving Stone

- First edition
- Author: Irving Stone
- Genre: Biographical novel
- Publisher: Longmans, Green
- Publication date: 1934
- Pages: 489
- ISBN: 978-0-671-78082-1

Lust for Life (1934) is a biographical novel by Irving Stone about the life of the Dutch painter Vincent van Gogh and his hardships. It was Stone's first major publication, and is largely based on the collection of letters between Vincent van Gogh and his younger brother, art dealer Theo van Gogh. This correspondence lays the foundation for most of what is known about the thoughts and beliefs of the artist. Stone conducted a large amount of "on-field" research for the novel, as is mentioned in the afterword.

The narrative of Lust for Life creates origin-stories for many of the artist's famous paintings. including The Potato Eaters and Sunflowers. Stone wanted to explain Van Gogh's difficult life and how he began, flourished, and died as a painter. People close to Van Gogh's life, like Paul Gauguin, are also characters in the novel.

The book is divided into nine smaller "books", titled based on the places Van Gogh lived: London (Prologue), the Borinage, Etten, The Hague, Paris, Arles, St. Remy, and Auvers.

The novel was adapted into a 1956 film of the same name starring Kirk Douglas, which was nominated for four Academy Awards, winning one.
