= Vincent (1987 film) =

- Directed by: Paul Cox
- Written by: Paul Cox
- Starring: John Hurt; Marika Rivera; Gabriella Trsek
- Cinematography: Paul Cox
- Edited by: Paul Cox
- Music by: Norman Kaye
- Release dates: 15 September 1987 (Toronto); 8 October 1987 (Australia)
- Running time: 105 minutes
- Country: Australia
- Box office: A$301,205

Vincent: The Life and Death of Vincent van Gogh is a 1987 documentary film by Australian director Paul Cox, exploring the last eight years of the artist's life. Cox was attracted to the project because of his personal admiration for Vincent van Gogh:

I found him such a compassionate, wonderful human being. That attracted me above all. I found him always honest, always real, always doing his utmost, and I related very much to his type of loneliness. It's the loneliness, the dreadful loneliness that I've known all my life. That was still much stronger for me when I tried to become a film-maker - you know, up to 30, 35, I was terribly alone. I was not equipped for the world at all, and, at that level, that is a very similar background to Vincent.

The screen images consist of a wide selection of the paintings and sketches, shown in a chronological sequence, supplemented by shots of the locations he lived in, and a number of dramatised reconstructions of biographical events.

John Hurt reads the letters of Vincent van Gogh to his brother Theo.

The film was a popular hit on the art house circuit and ran for two years in New York City.
