= Biographical novel =

Novel containing a fictional account of a person's life

The biographical novel is a genre of novel which provides a fictional account of a contemporary or historical person's life. Like other forms of biographical fiction, details are often trimmed or reimagined to meet the artistic needs of the fictional genre, the novel. These reimagined biographies are sometimes called semi-biographical novels, to distinguish the relative historicity of the work from other biographical novels.

The genre rose to prominence in the 1930s with best-selling works by authors such as Robert Graves, Thomas Mann, Irving Stone and Lion Feuchtwanger. These books became best-sellers, but the genre was dismissed by literary critics. In later years it became more accepted and has become both a popular and critically accepted genre.

Some biographical novels bearing only superficial resemblance to the historical novels or introducing elements of other genres that supersede the retelling of the historical narrative, for example Abraham Lincoln, Vampire Hunter follows the plot devices of a vampire fiction closely. Biographical fiction often also falls within the genres of historical fiction or alternative history.

Some novels that are known best for their fictional prowess, but include extensive biographical information that is less obvious to readers. A very good example of this kind is Goldsmith's The Vicar of Wakefield, believed to be the biography of a person the author had known and observed very closely.

Biographical novels are frequently the foundation for film adaptations into the filmographic genre of biographical film. In such novels and films, there are main stories and real characters, but changes are made in order to make the story and film more interesting. Of course, sometimes these changes become too much and, for example, a negative character is reversed and some kind of historical distortion occurs. For this reason, such novels should give the necessary information to the reader in advance.

For more reflection on the different types of biographical information used in literature, see biography in literature.

== Notable biographical novels ==
- The Moon and Sixpence (1919) by W. Somerset Maugham—Paul Gauguin
- I, Claudius (1934) by Robert Graves—Claudius
- Lotte in Weimar: The Beloved Returns (1939) by Thomas Mann—Goethe
- The Agony and the Ecstasy (1961) by Irving Stone—Michelangelo
- Blonde (2000) by Joyce Carol Oates—Marilyn Monroe
- The Revenant (2002) by Michael Punke—US frontiersman Hugh Glass
- The Great Lover (2009) by Jill Dawson—Fictional woman's relationship with Rupert Brooke
- The Wettest County in the World (2008) by Matt Bondurant—Author's grandfather and his brothers, bootleggers

== See also ==
- Biopic
- Biography in literature
- Historical novel
- List of composers in literature
