= Mayo =

Mayo often refers to:

- Mayonnaise, a sauce, usually made with eggs
- County Mayo, in the west of Ireland
- Mayo Clinic, a medical center in Rochester, Minnesota, United States
- Mayo (given name)
- Mayo (surname), includes a list of people with the name
- Mayo (horse), an Indonesian-bred racehorse foaled in 2022

Mayo may also refer to:

== Places ==
=== Antarctica ===
- Mayo Peak, Marie Byrd Land

=== Australia ===
- Division of Mayo, an Australian Electoral Division in South Australia

=== Canada ===
- Mayo, a township in Ontario, now a part of Carlow/Mayo
- Mayo, Quebec, a municipality
- Mayo, Yukon, a village
  - Mayo (electoral district), Yukon, a former electoral district

=== Cape Verde ===
- Maio, Cape Verde (also formerly known as Mayo Island)

=== Republic of Ireland ===
- Mayo (Dáil constituency)
- County Mayo (Parliament of Ireland constituency)
- County Mayo (UK Parliament constituency)
- Mayo, County Mayo, a village

=== Ivory Coast ===
- Mayo, Ivory Coast, a town and commune

=== Sudan ===
- Mayo, Khartoum, a neighborhood

=== Thailand ===
- Mayo district, Pattani

=== United Kingdom ===
- Mayo, a townland in County Down, Northern Ireland

=== United States ===
- Mayo, Florida, a town
- Mayo, Kentucky, an unincorporated community
- Mayo, Maryland, a census-designated place
- Mayo, South Carolina, a census-designated place
- Mayo Lake, North Carolina, a reservoir

=== Multiple places ===
- Mayo River (disambiguation), various rivers

== Schools ==
- Mayo Clinic School of Medicine, formerly Mayo Medical School, an American medical school that is part of the Mayo Clinic and the Mayo Clinic College of Medicine and Science
- Mayo High School, a public high school in Rochester, Minnesota, United States
- Mayo College, a secondary educational institution in Ajmer, Rajasthan, India

== People ==
- Mayo people, an indigenous ethnic group in the Mexican states of Sinaloa and Sonora
- Meo (ethnic group) or Mayo, an Indian ethnic tribe of Rajputs
- James Mayo, pen name of Stephen Coulter (born 1913/14), English author

== Other uses ==
- Short Mayo Composite, a piggy-back long-range seaplane/flying boat combination built by Short Brothers in the late 1930s
- USS Mayo (DD-422), World War II US Navy destroyer
- Earl of Mayo, a title in the Peerage of Ireland
- Viscount Mayo, a title that has been created twice in the Peerage of Ireland
- Mayo GAA, a county board of the Gaelic Athletic Association
  - Mayo county football team
  - Mayo county hurling team
- Mayo language, spoken by the Mayo people in Mexico
- Mayo (TV series), a BBC television series first broadcast in 2006
- "Mayo" (song), by DJ Speedsta
- Mayo Hospital, in Lahore, Pakistan
- Mayo Hotel, Tulsa, Oklahoma, on the National Register of Historic Places
- Mexican American Youth Organization
- Project Mayo, an open source project by DivX, Inc.
- Mayo v. Prometheus, a U.S. Supreme Court case
- Avenida de Mayo, an avenue in Buenos Aires, Argentina

== See also ==
- Maio (disambiguation)
- Meo (disambiguation)
