= Meos =

Meo or Meos may refer to:

- MenuetOS, or MeOS, an operating system
- Microsomal ethanol oxidizing system, an alternate ethanol metabolic pathway
- mEos, a variant of the photoactivatable fluorescent protein Eos
- Märt Meos (1881–1966), Estonian educator and politician
- Mati Meos (born 1946), Estonian engineer and politician

== See also ==
- Meo (disambiguation)
