= Gayo =

Gayo may refer to:

- Gayo language of Sumatra
- Gayo people, an ethnic group in Aceh, Indonesia
- Gayo Lues Regency, a regency in Aceh, Indonesia
- Gayo, or K-pop, the Korean term for pop music
- Gayo (poem), old form of the Korean traditional poetry

== See also ==
- Gay (disambiguation)
- Gaios, a port in Greece
- Gaia (disambiguation)
- Mayo (disambiguation)
