= Mewe =

Mewe can refer to:

- the German name for Gniew, a town in Pomeranian Voivodeship in northern Poland
- MeWe, an American social media company

== See also ==
- Mew (disambiguation)
- Mewing (disambiguation)
