= Meo people =

Meo people may refer to:

- Meo (ethnic group), a Muslim ethnic group in northern India
- Miao people, a group of peoples in Southern China and Southeast Asia

== See also ==
- Meo (disambiguation)
