= Meo =

Meo or MEO may refer to:

- Meo (surname), list of people with the surname
- Marco Enríquez-Ominami politician
- Medium Earth orbit, region of space around Earth above low Earth orbit
- Meo (ethnic group), also Mayo, Muslim inhabitants of Mewat, a region in North-Western India
- Méo, a town in Ivory Coast
- MEO (telecommunication company), a brand of Altice Portugal used for services targeting individuals and homes
- Miao people (from transcription), group of peoples living in Southern China and Southeast Asia
- Kedah Malay (ISO 639-3 code), a variety of the Malayan languages

== See also ==
- Meos (disambiguation)
- Mew (disambiguation)
- Mayo (disambiguation)
- Miao (disambiguation)
