= Maio =

Maio or MAIO can refer to:

== Places ==
- Maio, Cape Verde, an island
  - Battle of Maio, fought between British and French naval forces in 1814
  - Vila do Maio, the main urban settlement on the island
- Maio, Guinea-Bissau, one of the Bissagos Islands
- Maio River, in Chile's Santiago Metropolitan Region

== People ==
- Maio of Bari (died 1160), Sicilian admiral and statesman
- Giovan Tomaso di Maio (c. 1490–after 1548), Italian composer
- Giuseppe de Majo or di Maio (1697–1771), Italian composer and organist
- José Rodrigues Maio (1817–1884), Portuguese lifeguard and fisherman
- Luigi Di Maio (born 1986), Italian politician
- Marcello Maio, Australian jazz pianist and composer
- Paolo de Maio (1703–1784), Italian painter
- Roberto Di Maio (born 1982), Italian footballer
- Sebastian De Maio (born 1987), Italian-French footballer
- Vincent Di Maio, American pathologist

== MAIO ==
- Mobile Allocation Index Offset, in GSM
- MAIO, an architectural office based in Barcelona, Spain, cofounded by Anna Puigjaner et al
