= Mew =

Mew, MEW, mews, MEWS or mewing may refer to:

== People ==
- Mew (surname)
- Mew Azama (born 1986), Japanese model and actress
- Suppasit Jongcheveevat (born 1991), Thai actor nicknamed 'Mew'
- Mary Elizabeth Winstead (born 1984), commonly used acronym for this actress.
- Andrew Mewing (born 1981), Australian swimmer

== Arts and entertainment ==
=== Fictional characters ===
- Mew (Pokémon), a mythical, rare Pokémon from Kanto
- Mew, a fictional seagull in "Roverandom"
- Mew, a character in the Thai movie Love of Siam

=== Architecture ===
- Mews, a type of housing in Britain
- Mews (falconry), a birdhouse designed to house one or more birds of prey

=== Other uses in arts and entertainment ===
- Mew (band), from Denmark
- Mew (singer) (born 1999), Italian singer-songwriter
- Mewgenics, a 2026 tactical role-playing roguelike life simulation video game

== Economics ==
- Mortgage equity withdrawal, the decision of consumers to borrow money against the real value of their houses
- Measure of Economic Welfare
- Ministry of Economic Warfare, a British Ministry during World War II

== Science and technology ==
- Microwave Early Warning (AN/CPS-1) - radar developed by the MIT Radiation Laboratory during WWII
- Manufacturer's Empty Weight, the weight of the aircraft "as built"
- Modified early warning score, a tool for evaluating deteriorating patients in medicine
- Mew (software), a female vocal for Vocaloid 3

== Other uses ==
- Mew (cat vocalization), a soft crying sound
- Mew, a rare synonym for seagull
- Short-billed gull, a species of bird in the gull family
- Mew Island, one of the Copeland Islands
- Mews (restaurant), in Baltimore, Ireland
- Mewing (orthotropics), a pseudoscientific technique intending to improve one's jawline
- Mewing kingfisher, a species of bird in the kingfisher family
- Mews (software), a property management tool

== See also ==
- Mu (disambiguation)
- Moo (disambiguation)
- Meo (disambiguation)
- MEV (disambiguation)
- Myu (disambiguation)
- Muse (disambiguation)
- MEWA (disambiguation)
