= MYU =

MYU, Myu or Myū can refer to:

- Myū Azama
- Doctor Myū, a character in Dragon Ball GT
- Miyagi University
- Myu - A singer and composer, member of Kukui (band)
- The Greek letter mu (Μ or μ)
- MYU - A current member of LinQ

== See also ==
- Mew (disambiguation)
