= Mayo River =

Mayo River (Spanish: Río Mayo) may refer to:

- Mayo River (Dan River tributary), in North Carolina and Virginia, United States
- Mayo River (Mexico)
- Mayo River (Peru)
- Mayo River (Argentina)
- Mayo River (Colombia)
- Río Mayo, Chubut, town in Chubut, Argentina

== See also ==
- Mayo (disambiguation)
- Río Mayo (Mexico City Metrobús), a BRT station in Mexico City
