= Anton Hirschig =

Dutch painter

Antonius (Anton) Matthias Hirschig (18 February 1867, Naarden - 6 November 1939, Alkmaar), also known as Tony or Tom, was a Dutch artist who, as a young man, lodged with Vincent van Gogh at the Auberge Ravoux in Auvers-sur-Oise at the time of Van Gogh's death in 1890.

== Biography ==
Antonius Matthias Hirschig was born on 18 February 1867 in Naarden, a town in the province of North Holland in the Netherlands. He was the son of Christianus Jacobus Johannes Hirsching and Anna Swart. His father was an Amsterdam trained physician in the Dutch Royal Navy and his grandfather Antonius Hirschig was a rector of the Latin academy in Alkmaar. Hirschig's paternal aunts Adriana Wilhelmina Hirschig and Jacoba Gysberta Hirschig married into the wealthy de Lange banking family of Alkmaar as did Hirschig's sister Anna in a consanguineous marriage to a son of Jacoba Gysberta. In addition Hirschig's brother Adrianus Jacobus Hirschig was a successful civil engineer (he built sea dykes) who became extremely wealthy in his own right (wealthy enough to own a considerable country house 'Postwyck' in Baambrugge).

Hirschig's own financial circumstances are not documented nor is a profession or occupation documented for him other than 'kunstschilder' (artist) in the Hirschig genealogy deposited in the de Lange archive in Alkmaar in 1958. However Hirschig may well have come into money from his mother Anna Swart. Her father Jacob Swart was a director of the noted Amsterdam chartmaking firm Van Keulen and carried on the business after the death of its last founding family member. The firm was liquidated in 1885. After Anna Swart's death, Anton Hirschig's father married her sister Catharina Swart.

Anton's other brother Jacob Hirschig was an artillery officer and he is listed as an 'amateurschilder' (amateur painter) in Pieter Scheen's monumental Lexicon Nederlandse Beeldende Kunstenaars 1750 - 1950. There was another sister Matthia Hirschig with whom Anton Hirschig is confused in the first (1969) edition of Scheen's lexicon.

There was a family connection with the Dutch painter Anton Mauve. His mother Elisabeth Margaretha Hirschig was a first cousin twice removed of Anton Hirschig. In addition, Mauve himself was married to Ariëtte (Jet) Sophia Jeannette Carbentus, a first cousin of Vincent van Gogh, and Mauve offered early encouragement and instruction to Van Gogh. It does seem likely therefore that Anton Hirschig's introduction to Van Gogh was facilitated by these family connections (however Theo van Gogh in his letter of 15 June 1890 to Vincent says that De Bock had introduced him).

Jacoba Gysberta Hirschig is a great-grandmother of Pieter van Vollenhoven, the husband of Princess Margriet of the Netherlands. The Hirschig family itself originated with a Swiss mercenary soldier Samuel Hirsig from Amsoldingen, who settled in Breda, Netherlands, with his wife Catharina Luginbuhl (Logebuli) from Grosshöchstetten, before 1757 with the Stürler regiment. His son Jacobus Christiaan in Hirschig's line became a minister in the Dutch Reformed Church and other members of the Hirschig family gained prominence as classics scholars, for example Willem Adrianus Hirschig provided a translation (in decent Latin) of the popular but raunchy Ancient Greek romance Leucippe and Clitophon in his Erotici Scriptores (Paris, 1856). The family name Hirschig is now defunct.

Hirschig died in Alkmaar on 6 November 1939.

== Literature ==
Pieter Scheen's entry in the first (1969) and 1981 editions of his lexicon confuses Hirschig with his sister Matthia Antonia and accordingly gives him the wrong dates while at the same time crediting him with such prodigies as organising an exhibition in The Hague at the age of 13. How much of the entry can be trusted in the circumstances is thus a matter for judgement but Hirschig (at age 23) may indeed have held exhibitions in The Hague and Arnhem in 1890 (the year of Van Gogh's death) and subsequently Amsterdam in 1903. It is also true that a 1922 (not 1912) painting of Hirschig's found its way into The Hague's Municipal Museum as part of the Bredius gift to the nation.

== Auvers ==
Hirschig lodged with Vincent van Gogh at the Auberge Ravoux from around 17 June 1890 to shortly after Van Gogh's death. He occupied the attic room next to Van Gogh's and these two rooms can still be seen at the inn. It is not documented whether Hirschig was taking lessons from Van Gogh.

Anton Hirschig is mentioned in three of Van Gogh's letters. At first Van Gogh thought Hirschig too "gentil" to be an artist and questions whether he would ever amount to anything. However, in what was to be Van Gogh's last letter (to his brother Theo), he softens his position and says that he thinks Hirschig has begun to understand things a little better. Curiously that was also destined to be the last judgement he ever made on an artist in his letters.

Adeline Ravoux, the daughter of the innkeeper at the Auberge Ravoux, described Vincent's stay at the inn in a memoir. She was some 12 years old at the time and approaching 80 when her memoir were published.

In the memoir, Adeline Ravoux recalls Hirschig as apparently more interested in beautiful girls than painting. She recalls him as speaking French very badly and that consequently he and Van Gogh were obliged to speak Dutch together. She didn't think Van Gogh took him very seriously. She records Hirschig as leaving the inn shortly after Van Gogh's death.

== Account of Van Gogh's death ==
Van Gogh shot himself in a field on 27 July 1890 and died in the early hours of 29 July. In a letter to Albert Plasschaert written "half a lifetime later" in 1911, Hirschig gives a graphic and shocking account of Van Gogh's death which is sharply at variance with the moving and sensitive account given by Émile Bernard in a letter to Albert Aurier.

Il était couché dans sa mansarde sous un toit en zinc. Il faisait terriblement chaud. ’t was in de maand Augustus. Hij is daar eenige dagen gebleven. Misschien maar enkelen. Misschien velen. ’t Komt mij voor velen. ’s nachts schreeuwde hij, schreeuwde hij hard. Zijn bed stond tegen ’t beschot van de andere mansarde waar ik sliep: Il n’y a donc personne qui veut m’ouvrir le ventre! Midden in de nacht ik geloof dat er niemand bij hem was en ’t was zoo warm. Ik heb geloof ik nooit een andere docter gezien als zijn vriend de gewezen militaire dokter: C’est ta propre faute, pourquoi t’es-tu tué? Hij had geen instrumenten die dokter. Hij heeft daar gelegen tot dat hij dood was.

He lay in his attic room under a tin roof. It was terribly hot. It was August. He stayed there alone for some days. Perhaps only a few. Perhaps many. It seemed to me like a lot. At night he cried out, cried out loud. His bed stood just beside the partition of the other attic room where I slept: Isn't there anyone willing to open me up! I don't think there was anyone with him in the middle of the night and it was so hot. I don't think I ever saw any other doctor like his friend the retired army doctor: It's your own fault, what did you have to go kill yourself for? He didn't have any instruments this doctor. He lay there until he died.

Hirschig doesn't describe the funeral itself though he was present at the funeral and assisted in the arrangements, collecting flowers for the coffin and walking to Méry nearby to hire the hearse.

In 1934 Abraham Bredius supplied in Oud Holland a short excerpt from a letter of Hirschig's detailing his recollections of Van Gogh. The letter itself is not documented. The piece is careless in describing Hirschig as having lived with Van Gogh in the south of France whereas Auvers lies north of Paris. The excerpt covers much the same ground as the Plasschaert letter and in addition the following remarks of Hirschig's are quoted:

"Ik zie hem nog altijd met zijn afgesneden oor en zijn verwilderde oogen, waar iets krankzinnigs in zat en die ik niet dorst aan te kijken, zitten op de bank voor 't raam van 't cafétje ... (lit.: I can still him see with his cut off ear and his wild eyes, in which was resting something crazy and which I didn't dare look into, sitting on the bench at the café window...)"

"... tout était terrible chez cet homme. Je crois qu'il a beaucoup souffert sur cette terre. Je ne l'ai jamais vu sourire.... (everything was dreadful about that man. I think he suffered a great deal in life. I never saw him smile.)"
