= Mew (surname) =

Mew is a surname. Notable people with the surname include:

- Charlotte Mew (1869–1928), English poet
- Chris Mew (born 1961), Australian rules footballer
- Darren James Mew (born 1975), English music producer
- Darren Mew (born 1979), British swimmer
- John Mew (1928–2025), British orthodontist
- Jack Mew (1889–1963), English football goalkeeper
- James Mew (1837–1913), English lawyer and biographer
- Peter Mew, British audio engineer
- Scarlett Mew Jensen, British diver
- William Mew (1602–c. 1669), English clergyman, playwright and beekeeper
