= Vincent Di Maio =

American pathologist (1941–2022)

Vincent J. M. Di Maio
- Born: March 22, 1941; New York City, U.S.
- Died: September 18, 2022 (aged 81); San Antonio, Texas, U.S.
- Education: Downstate Medical School; Duke University
- Occupation: Pathologist

Vincent Joseph Martin Di Maio (March 22, 1941 – September 18, 2022) was an American pathologist and an expert on the subject of gunshot wounds. Born in Brooklyn, New York, he was a board-certified anatomic, clinical and forensic pathologist, and a private forensic pathology consultant.

== Early life and education ==
Di Maio was the son of Dominick Di Maio, chief medical examiner of New York City. Vincent Di Maio attended St. John's University and the State University of New York (SUNY). He graduated in 1965 from Downstate Medical School and received postgraduate training at Duke University, SUNY, and the Office of the Chief Medical Examiner of Maryland.

== Career ==
Di Maio was a veteran of the U.S. Army Medical Corps, and served as chief medical examiner of San Antonio, Texas, until 2006, when he retired; Di Maio had more than 40 years of experience as a forensic pathologist. He was the editor-in-chief of the American Journal of Forensic Medicine and Pathology, and was a professor of the Department of Pathology at the University of Texas Health Science Center at San Antonio. Di Maio was a fellow of the National Association of Medical Examiners (NAME) and the American Academy of Forensic Sciences, and in 2011, he was appointed to the Texas Forensic Science Commission by Governor Rick Perry.

== Expert opinions ==
Di Maio authored or co-authored four books and numerous articles related to forensic pathology, and won several awards for his work, including the Outstanding Service Award from the National Association of Medical Examiners. Di Maio gave expert testimony in a number of high-profile trials, including the exhumation of Lee Harvey Oswald's body on October 4, 1981, the trial of Phil Spector for the murder of Lana Clarkson, at which he claimed that Lana Clarkson's death was suicide, and the George Zimmerman murder trial and provided expert opinion on the death of Vincent Van Gogh.

== Death ==
Di Maio died from complications of COVID-19 at his home in San Antonio, on September 18, 2022, at the age of 81, amidst the COVID-19 pandemic in Texas. He was buried at Fort Sam Houston National Cemetery.

== Bibliography ==
- Gunshot Wounds: Practical Aspects of Firearms, Ballistics, and Forensic Techniques (1992) (2e: 1999, 3e: 2021)
- Forensic Pathology (1992) (2e: 2001) (3e: 2022)
- Handbook of Forensic Pathology (1998) (2e: 2007)
- Excited Delirium Syndrome: Cause of Death and Prevention (2005)
- Morgue: A Life in Death (2016)

== See also ==
- Ballistic trauma
- Forensic pathology
- Outline of forensic science
- Terminal ballistics
