= Microsomal ethanol oxidizing system =

Alternate ethanol oxidizing system in human metabolism

The microsomal ethanol oxidizing system (MEOS) is an alternate pathway of ethanol metabolism that occurs in the smooth endoplasmic reticulum in the oxidation of ethanol to acetaldehyde. While playing only a minor role in ethanol metabolism in average individuals, MEOS activity increases after chronic alcohol consumption. The MEOS pathway requires the CYP2E1 enzyme, part of the cytochrome P450 family of enzymes, to convert ethanol to acetaldehyde. Ethanol’s affinity for CYP2E1 is lower than its affinity for alcohol dehydrogenase. It has delayed activity in non-chronic alcohol consumption states as increase in MEOS activity is correlated with an increase in production of CYP2E1, seen most conclusively in alcohol dehydrogenase negative deer mice.

The MEOS pathway converts ethanol to acetaldehyde by way of a redox reaction. In this reaction, ethanol is oxidized (losing two hydrogens) and O_{2} is reduced (by accepting hydrogen) to form H_{2}O. NADPH is used as the donor of hydrogen, forming NADP^{+}. This process consumes ATP and dissipates heat, thus leading to the hypothesis that long term drinkers see an increase in resting energy expenditure.

The increase in rest energy expenditure has, according to some studies, been explained by indicating that the MEOS "expends" nine calories per gram of ethanol to metabolize versus 7 calories per gram of ethanol ingested. This results in a net loss of 2 calories per gram of ethanol ingested.
