= Mayo (horse) =

Indonesian-bred racehorse

- Breed: KP6 (Pordasi classification)
- Sire: Da Vinci Eclipse
- Grandsire: Red Giant
- Dam: Manjusha
- Damsire: Long War
- Sex: Filly
- Foaled: August 11, 2022
- Country: Indonesia
- Colour: Bay (Jragem)
- Breeder: Miranda Stable
- Owner: Audrey N. Supit
- Trainer: Steven Paendong
- Jockey: Jones Paendong; Febri Paendong; Franky Turangan
- Record: 4: 1-2-0

Major wins
- Kejurnas: 3 Year Old Derby Div. I (2025)

Mayo (foaled August 11, 2022 in Tompaso, Minahasa, North Sulawesi) is an Indonesian racehorse.

== Background ==
Mayo is a bay filly foaled on August 11, 2022 at Tompaso, Minahasa, North Sulawesi. She was sired by Da Vinci Eclipse out of Manjusha. Through her grandsire Red Giant, she is a descendant of Kingmambo.

Mayo is currently trained by Steven Paendong and ridden by Jones Paendong. Mayo has the same sire as Milord, a famous racehorse from North Sulawesi.

Mayo, being a KP6, is the result of six generations of breeding a thoroughbred sire with a local dam.

== Racing career ==
=== Two-year old season ===
Mayo made her debut race at the Christmas Festival event, held by the North Sulawesi branch of PORDASI on December 28, 2024. She lost to Sun Power by a three-quarter length. Her next race was the 2-Year-Old Novice in the Indonesia Horse Racing Cup 2025, where she lost to Shogun Eclipse by four-and-a-half lengths. At Kejurnas Series I 2025, Mayo again entered the same class in her late 2-year-old season, but she only finished in sixth place.

=== Three-year old season ===
After experiencing several loses, Mayo finally won the 3-Year-Old Derby (Div. I) at Kejurnas Series II 2025.

=== Racing form ===
The data below are mostly based on information available on livestreams from the YouTube channel and website of Sarga. Co, the main company that organizes and manages professional horseracing tournaments in Indonesia.

Date	Racecourse	Name	Class	Distance	Entry	HN	Finished	Time	Jockey	Winner (2nd place)	Ref.
2024 – two-year-old season
Dec 28, 2024	Maesa Tompaso	Christmas Festival	2YO Debut A/B	800M	2	1	2nd		J. Paendong	Sun Power	
Jun 15, 2025	Sultan Agung	Indonesia's Horse Racing Cup	2YO Beginner A/B	1200M	6	6	2nd		F. Paendong	Shogun Eclipse	
Jul 27, 2025	Sultan Agung	Kejurnas Series I	2YO Beginner A/B	1400M	11	6	6th		F. Turangan	Maxi of Khalim	
2025 – three-year-old season
Oct 19, 2025	Sultan Agung	Kejurnas Series II	Derby Div. I	1400M	7	3	1st		J. Paendong	(Tokugawa Eclipse)	

== Pedigree ==
Pedigree of Mayo (IDN), Bay Filly, 2022
Sire Da Vinci Eclipse (NZ)	Red Giant (USA)	Giant's Causeway (USA)	Storm Cat (USA)
Sire Da Vinci Eclipse (NZ)	Red Giant (USA)	Giant's Causeway (USA)	Mariah's Storm (USA)
Sire Da Vinci Eclipse (NZ)	Red Giant (USA)	Beyond The Sun (USA)	Kingmambo (USA)
Sire Da Vinci Eclipse (NZ)	Red Giant (USA)	Beyond The Sun (USA)	Carnet Solaire (USA)
Sire Da Vinci Eclipse (NZ)	Danwood (AUS)	Woodman (USA)	Mr. Prospector (USA)
Sire Da Vinci Eclipse (NZ)	Danwood (AUS)	Woodman (USA)	Playmate (USA)
Sire Da Vinci Eclipse (NZ)	Danwood (AUS)	Dansino (AUS)	Danehill (USA)
Sire Da Vinci Eclipse (NZ)	Danwood (AUS)	Dansino (AUS)	Leica Western (AUS)
Dam Manjusha (IDN)	Long War (USA)	Lord At War (ARG)	General (FR)
Dam Manjusha (IDN)	Long War (USA)	Lord At War (ARG)	Luna del Miel (ARG)
Dam Manjusha (IDN)	Long War (USA)	Lady Winborne (USA)	Secretariat (USA)
Dam Manjusha (IDN)	Long War (USA)	Lady Winborne (USA)	Priceless Gem (USA)
Dam Manjusha (IDN)	Noni Agis (IDN)	Cal Harbor (USA)	Forty Niner (USA)
Dam Manjusha (IDN)	Noni Agis (IDN)	Cal Harbor (USA)	Balinese (USA)
Dam Manjusha (IDN)	Noni Agis (IDN)	Fygi (IDN)	Adi Negara (AUS)
Dam Manjusha (IDN)	Noni Agis (IDN)	Fygi (IDN)	Heli Star (IDN)
