= Meo (surname) =

Meo (and its variants Méo, de Meo and diMeo) is a surname. Notable people with the surname include:

- Antonia De Meo, American lawyer and diplomat
- Antoine Méo (born 1984), French enduro rider
- Antonietta Meo (1930–1937), Italian Roman Catholic child venerable
- Gaetano Meo (1849–1925), Italian-British landscape painter.
- George de Meo, Italian-American arms dealer
- Giancarlo Meo, Italian record producer and entrepreneur
- Giulio Di Meo (born 1982), Italian tennis player
- Luca de Meo (born 1967), Italian business manager
- Paul De Meo (1953–2018), American screenwriter and film producer
- Paul DiMeo (born 1958), American television personality, and building designer
- Pip Meo (born 1984), New Zealand football player
- Rosanne Meo (born 1945/46), New Zealand businesswoman
- Roy DeMeo (1940–1983), Italian-American mobster
- Steven Meo, Welsh television actor
- Tony Meo (born 1959), English snooker player
- William DeMeo, American actor
