= Mayo (given name) =

Mayo is a given name. Notable people with the name include:

- Mayo Doko (土光 真代; born 1996), Japanese women's footballer
- Mayo Kawasaki (born 1963), Japanese actor
- Mayo Hibi (born 1996), Japanese tennis player
- Mayo Itoyama (糸山 真与; born 1991), Japanese synchronized swimmer
- Mayo Methot (1904–1951), American actress, third wife of Humphrey Bogart
- Mayo Okamoto (born 1974), Japanese singer-songwriter
- Mayo Smith (1915–1977), American baseball player and manager
- Mayo Suzukaze (born 1960), Japanese actress
- Mayo Thompson (born 1944), American musician and visual artist
- Mayo Yamaura (born 1984), Japanese curler
- J. Mayo Greenberg (1922-2001), American astrophysicist
