= Willem Bonger =

Dutch criminologist and sociologist

Willem Adriaan Bonger
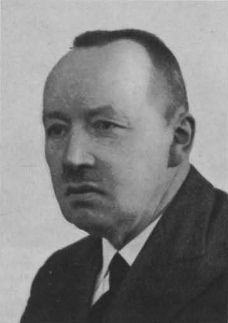
- Born: September 6, 1876; Amsterdam, Netherlands
- Died: May 15, 1940 (aged 63); Amsterdam, Netherlands
- Known for: Early Marxist criminology; analysis of economic factors on crime; opposition to Nazism and fascism
- Relatives: Johanna van Gogh-Bonger (sister); Andries Bonger (brother); Vincent Willem van Gogh (nephew)

Academic background
- Education: University of Amsterdam
- Thesis: Criminalité et conditions économiques (1905)
- Doctoral advisor: G.A. van Hamel
- Influences: Karl Marx, Friedrich Engels, Karl Kautsky, S. R. Steinmetz

Academic work
- Discipline: Criminology, Sociology
- Institutions: University of Amsterdam
- Notable works: Criminalité et conditions économiques (1905); Geloof en misdaad (1913); Problems of Democracy. A sociological and psychological study (1934); Ras en misdaad (1939)

Willem Adriaan Bonger (September 6, 1876 – May 15, 1940) was a Dutch criminologist and sociologist. He is considered an early Marxist criminologist which through his work, criminology stood out as an autonomous science, making its interrelationship with sociology more evident according to a scientific approach.

== Biography ==
Bonger was born in to a middle-class and intellectual family. His father Hendrik worked in an insurance company in Amsterdam and was the first to enable him, the youngest of ten children, to study at university. Both of his parents were Remonstrant Protestants. Willem's older brother Andries was an art dealer and friends with the brothers Theo and Vincent van Gogh, and his sister Johanna was the wife of Theo van Gogh.

Bonger attended the Barlaeus Gymnasium in Amsterdam and took up law studies at the University of Amsterdam in 1895, where he heard, among other things, criminal law from GA van Hamel. He was active in the Amsterdam student corps and joined the CLIO brotherhood, in which many students were interested in socialism at the time. After the parliamentary elections in 1897, Bonger joined the Social Democratic Workers' Party and was particularly active in the Socialist Reading Society.

Bonger took part in a writing competition in 1900, which the University of Amsterdam had advertised. The task was an analysis and criticism of the literature dealing with the influence of economic factors on crime. Bonger received an honorable mention and expanded his text to his dissertation Criminalité et conditions économiques, on which he received his doctorate in 1905 under van Hamel. He then joined the insurance company Brak en Mees as an authorized officer, where his father also worked. At the same time, however, he continued his university studies, including with the ethnologist and sociographer S. R. Steinmetz. He also published in various magazines such as De Kroniek, Tijdschrift voor criminal law, Die Neue Zeit, Het Volk and De Nieuwe Tijd.

In 1916 Bonger became editor of the magazine De Socialistische Gids, a position he held until 1938. He represented a reformist intellectualism and pursued a parliamentary course of social democracy, which was characterized by cautious rapprochement with the bourgeois parties. Together with Emanuel Boekman and Jan Goudriaan, Bonger played a key role in the reorientation of the SDAP, which abandoned pacifist positions. In his book Problems of Democracy. A sociological and psychological study (1934), he warned against autocratic tendencies and expressed his conviction that democracy could also be defended with arms.

In 1922 Bonger was appointed professor of sociology and criminology at the University of Amsterdam. In 1936 he was one of the founders of the Nederlandse Sociologische Vereniging (Dutch Sociological Association) and served as its president until 1940.

Bonger belonged to the Comité van waakzaamheid, which campaigned against Nazism and fascism. After the German invasion of the Netherlands on May 10, 1940, Bonger wrote to his son: "I see no future for myself and I cannot bow to this scum that will dominate us." He considered escape cowardly and because of his old age, he did not play a role in the Dutch resistance. The day after the Dutch surrender, he and his wife committed suicide in Amsterdam.

== Thought ==
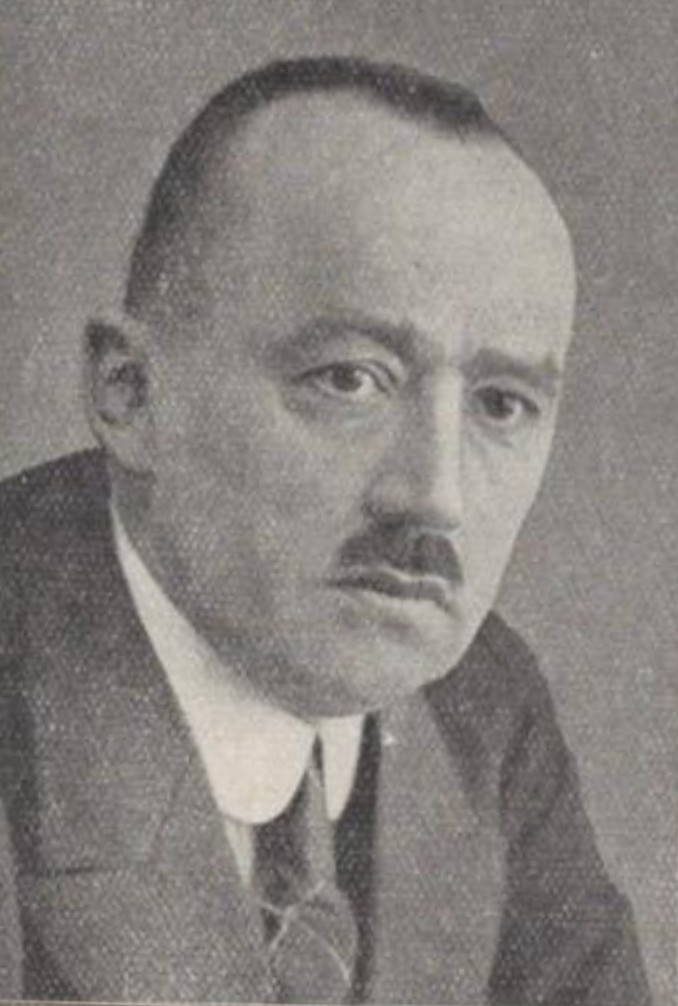
W.A. Bonger

With his dissertation, which was also translated into English in 1916, Bonger distinguished himself as one of the first Marxist criminologists. In his reception of Karl Marx, influenced by Friedrich Engels and Karl Kautsky, Bonger emphasized the unequal distribution of power between genders and classes in capitalist society. He emphasized that the classification of certain types of behavior as criminal does not depend on their moral character, but on their relation to the prevailing socio-economic order. Following Kautsky's concept of altruism, Bonger saw capitalism a strengthening of egoism, which weakens people's morality and encourages certain forms of crime, especially among the socially disadvantaged.

In further work, Bonger dealt with the influence of religion on crime and with the connection between race and crime. In 1913 he published Geloof en misdaad, which challenged the claim that secularization would lead to more crime. He also campaigned for the decriminalization of abortion and homosexuality. He had already sharply criticized Cesare Lombroso's criminal anthropology and later also critically dealt with the racial theory of Nazism. In 1935 he sharply opposed tendencies to adapt elements of the Nazi criminal law in the Netherlands. In 1939 he published Ras en misdaad (Race and Crime), in which he attributed the statistically increased crime rate among blacks to environmental influences.

== Works in English ==
- Criminality and Economic Conditions. Little, Brown, and Company, Boston 1916.
- An Introduction to Criminology, 1936
- Race and Crime, 1939
