= Willem Cornelis Bauer =

Dutch architect and painter

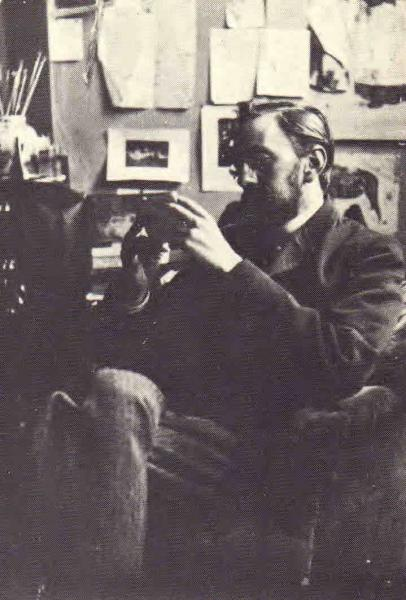
- Born: 31 July 1862; The Hague, Netherlands
- Died: 24 April 1904 (aged 41); Hilversum, Netherlands
- Known for: Painting, etching and architecture
- Notable work: Walden, Villa Eikenhof

Willem Cornelis Bauer (The Hague, 31 July 1862 – Hilversum, 24 April 1904) also known as Wilhelm Bauer was a Dutch architect and painter.

== Life course ==
=== Youth and education ===
Like his younger brother painter Marius Bauer, Willem Cornelis Bauer was born in an art-loving environment, the children learned to draw at an early age. His father, George Hendrik Bauer, was a decorator and his mother, Maria Suzanne Verpoorten, came from a family of painters.

Bauer studied at the Royal Academy of Art in The Hague, his fellow students included Karel de Bazel, Willem Kromhout. In 1888 he became a member of Architectura et Amicitia, where he also got to know Herman Cornelis Jorissen, Mathieu Lauweriks and Herman Walenkamp.

Bauer works for a period as a designer at the architectural firm Salm in Amsterdam, where he also lived.

=== Fame ===
Bauer lived temporarily in America at a young age, in the town of Elizabeth in the state of New Jersey. There he eventually became known for his paintings and watercolors of landscapes.

Bauer was best known in the Netherlands as the architect of the colony Walden started by the Dutch writer and psychiatrist Frederik van Eeden, where he also had his atelier in a hut he designed himself. Although he was often absent from here later on. The idea for this colony came from the American Henry Thoreau, who wrote the book Walden.

From 1891, he used late Gothic Islamic and Byzantine style elements in his designs. Although he used his talent to make many competition designs for a church, concert hall, theater and congress buildings, he did not want to compromise and possibly adapt his designs at the request of others. The jury often found his designs unconventional, which meant that he had little success in this field.

In the Netherlands, in the course of the nineties of the 19th-century, the idea of fair, rural architecture was picked up, just as with the English Arts and Crafts movement of the 1870s. A crucial role in this concept change played the architect Willem Bauer, who died young, K.P.C. de Bazel and Johan Wilhelm Hanrath. Eventually Bauer became the architect of intimate country houses and studio houses. The style of many of the houses designed by him is often characterized by exterior facades that are partially white finished with wooden details, in a romantic style. He designed a number of huts and villas in Bussum, for family and friends of Frederik van Eeden. Also a villa for Johanna Bonger (the sister-in-law of Vincent van Gogh) and a villa for George Breitner and his brother Marius Bauer. Willem Bauer also designed other houses in the Netherlands, but his oeuvre in this area has remained limited. Architect Willem Bauer is seen as one of the founders of the Gooise Country House style.

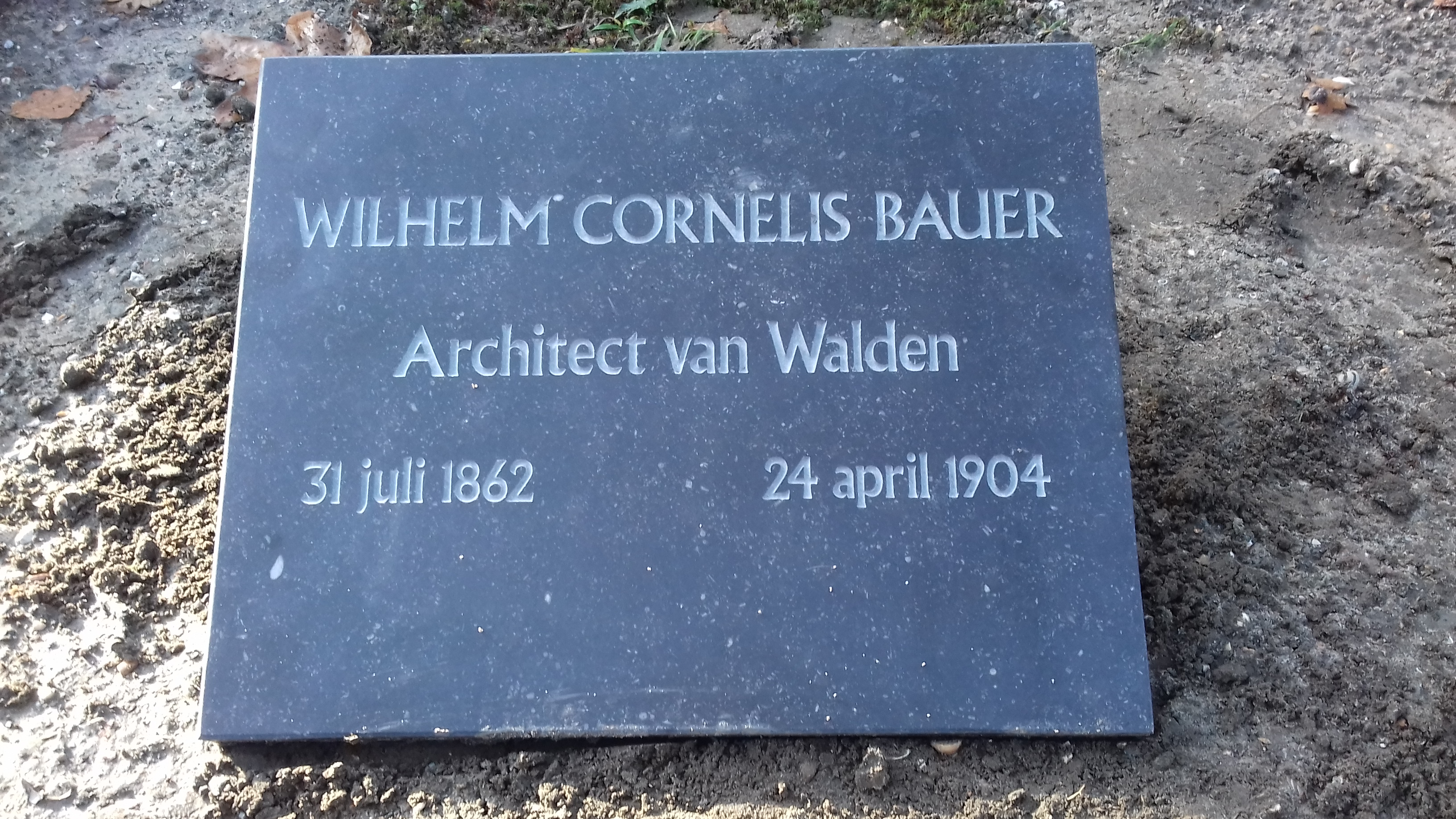
Memorial Stone W. C. Bauer

=== Death ===
At the end of his life he suffered from depression for which he was being treated by the psychiatrist Frederik van Eeden and he suffered from syphilitic paralysis. Van Eeden eventually found Bauer dead by suicide. He was buried on 29 April 1904 at the Bosdrift General Cemetery in Hilversum, near the place where he recently lived, on the Roeltjesweg in Hilversum. The newspaper Hilversumsche Courant of 30 April 1904 wrote in a necrology: He understood the rare art of building a homely house. On April 24, 2023 there was a small ceremony at the place Bauer was buried, at this occasion a gravestone was placed.

== List of buildings ==
Bussum

- Hut, van Frederik van Eeden, Frans Kampweg 22 (circa 1898), moved in 1908
- Villa De Maerle, Nieuwe 's-Gravelandseweg 77 (1898)
- Hut, van Carry van Hoogstraten, Nieuwe 's-Gravelandseweg 96 (circa 1898)
- Villa De Lelie, Nieuwe 's-Gravelandseweg 86, designed for Frederik van Eeden (1899)
- House Boschlust, Nieuwe 's-Gravelandseweg 88, designed as a home for the colonies (1899)
- House, French Kampweg 22, designed for Truida Everts (second wife Frederik van Eeden) (1899)
- Villa Eikenhof, Regentesselaan 39, designed for Jo Bongers and Johan Cohen Gosschalk (1901)
- House, Frans Kampweg 2, has been inhabited by the Reverend Anne de Koe from the Kolonie Walden (1902), renovated in 1912.

Blaricum

- Country house Thea, Torenlaan 13, designed for Jan Zoetelief Tromp (1900)

Bloemendaal/Aerdenhout

- Villa Stamboel, designed for his brother Marius Bauer (built 1901 - demolished)
- Villa De Merel, Marius Bauerlaan 5 in Aerdenhout (1901)
- House Gimli, Schulpweg 2, inhabited by Betsy van Vloten (demolished)
- Villa Zonnehof, Bentveldsweg 102, in collaboration with H.C. Jorissen, designed for Nico van Suchtelen (1901)
- Villa Duinweide, Bentveldsweg 104 (1902)
- Villa Rockaertsduin, Aerdenhoutsduinweg 13, designed for George Breitner (1902)

== Examples of painting, drawings and buildings designed by Willem Cornelis Bauer ==
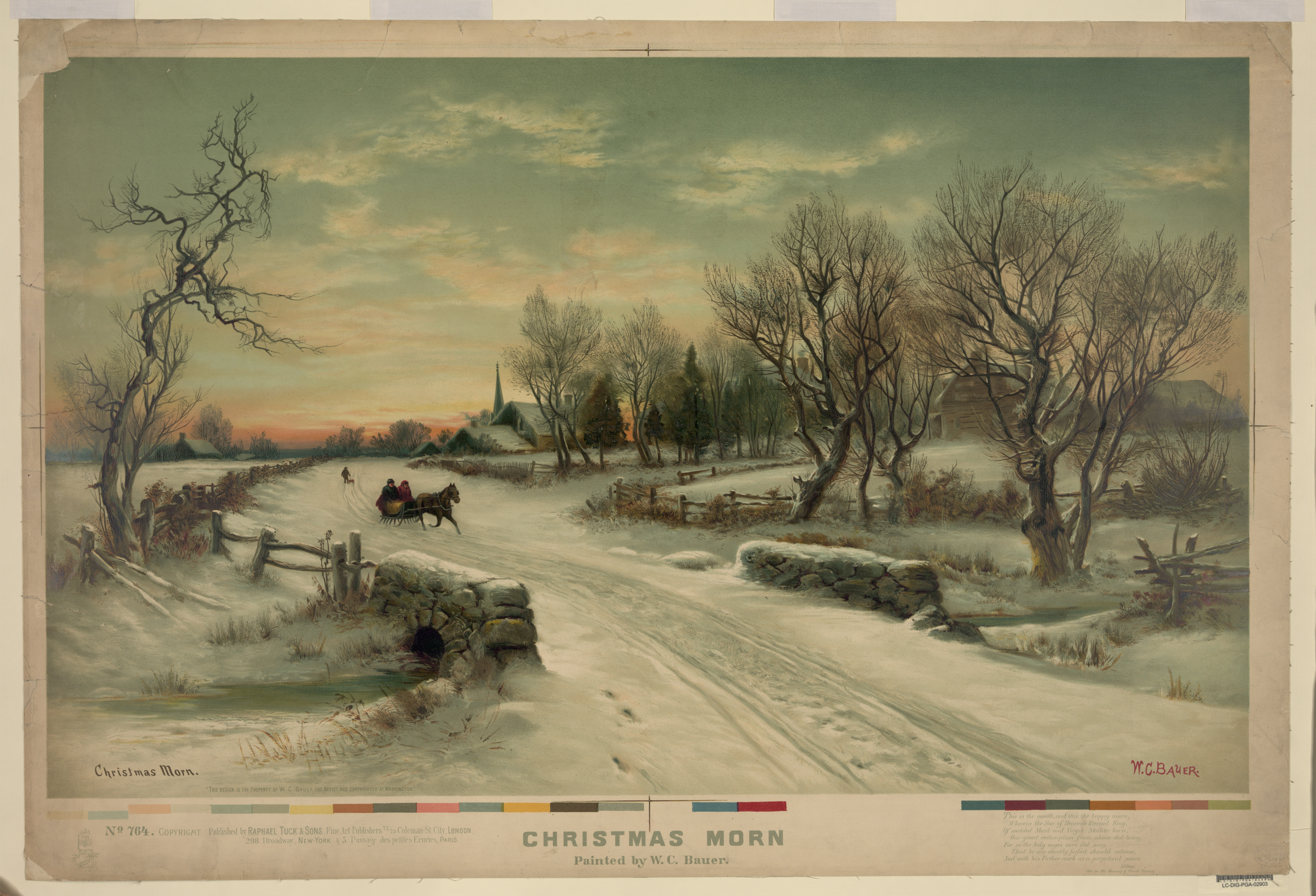
Christmas morn

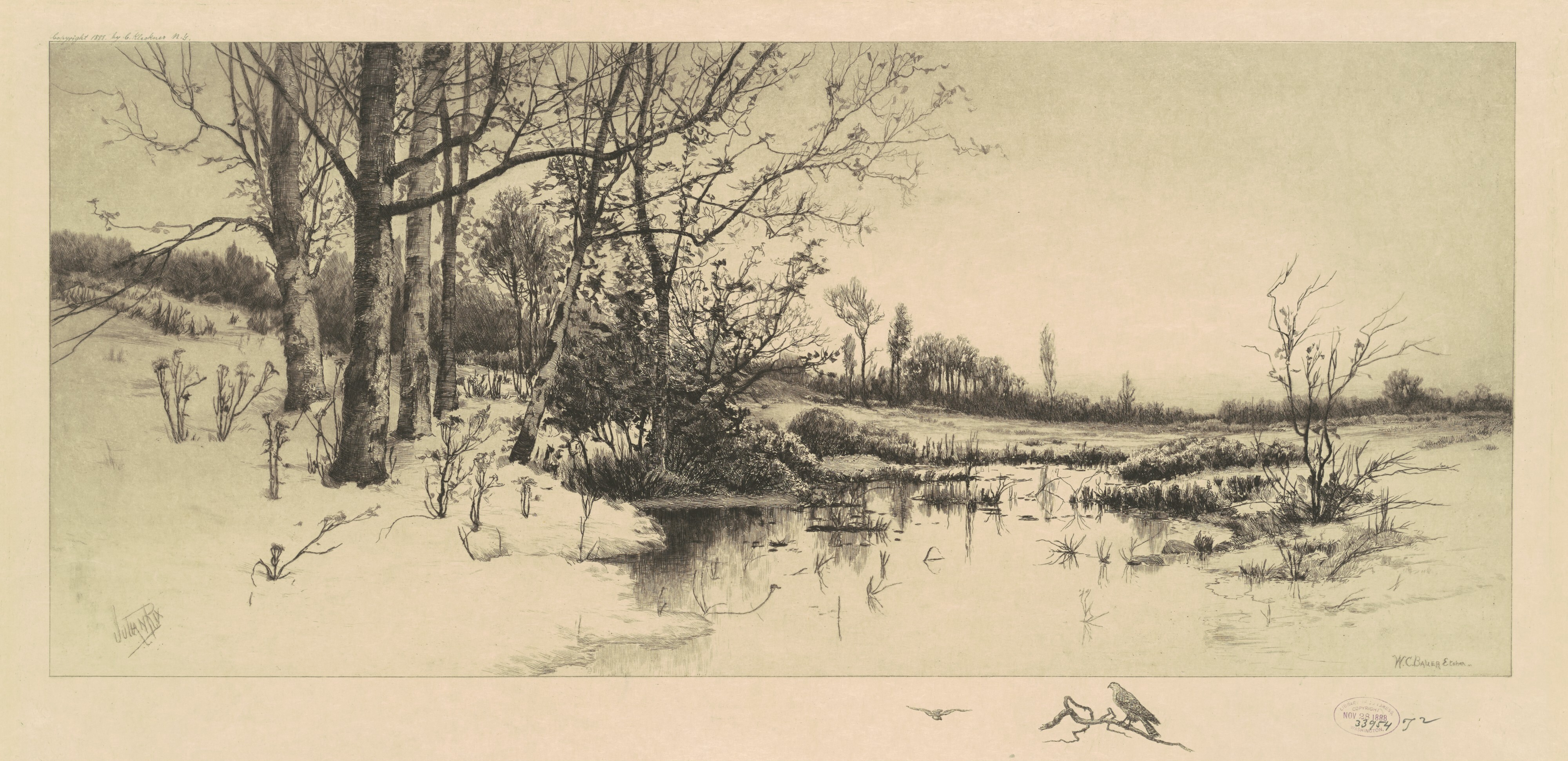
Etching Winter landscape

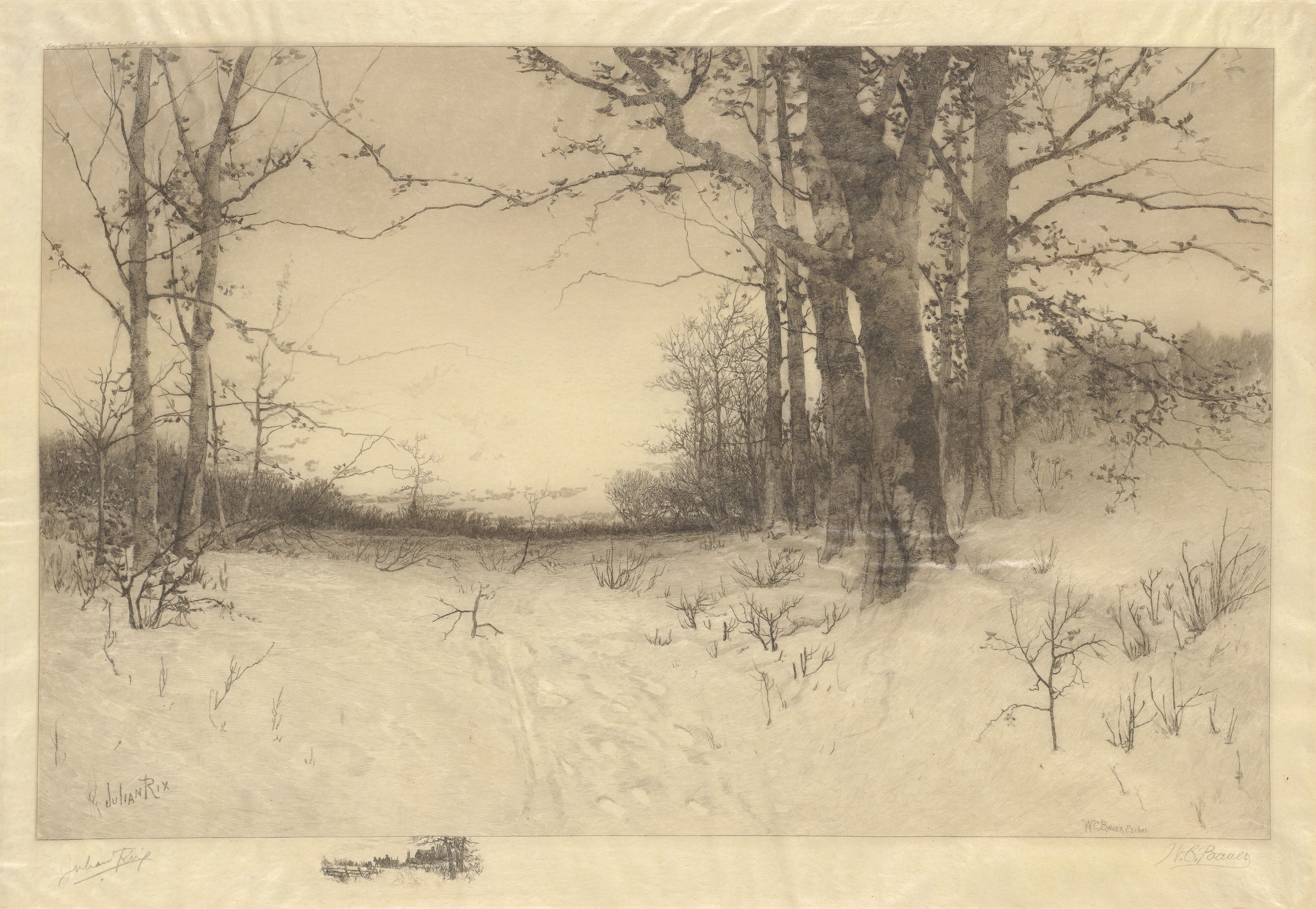
Etching Midwinter

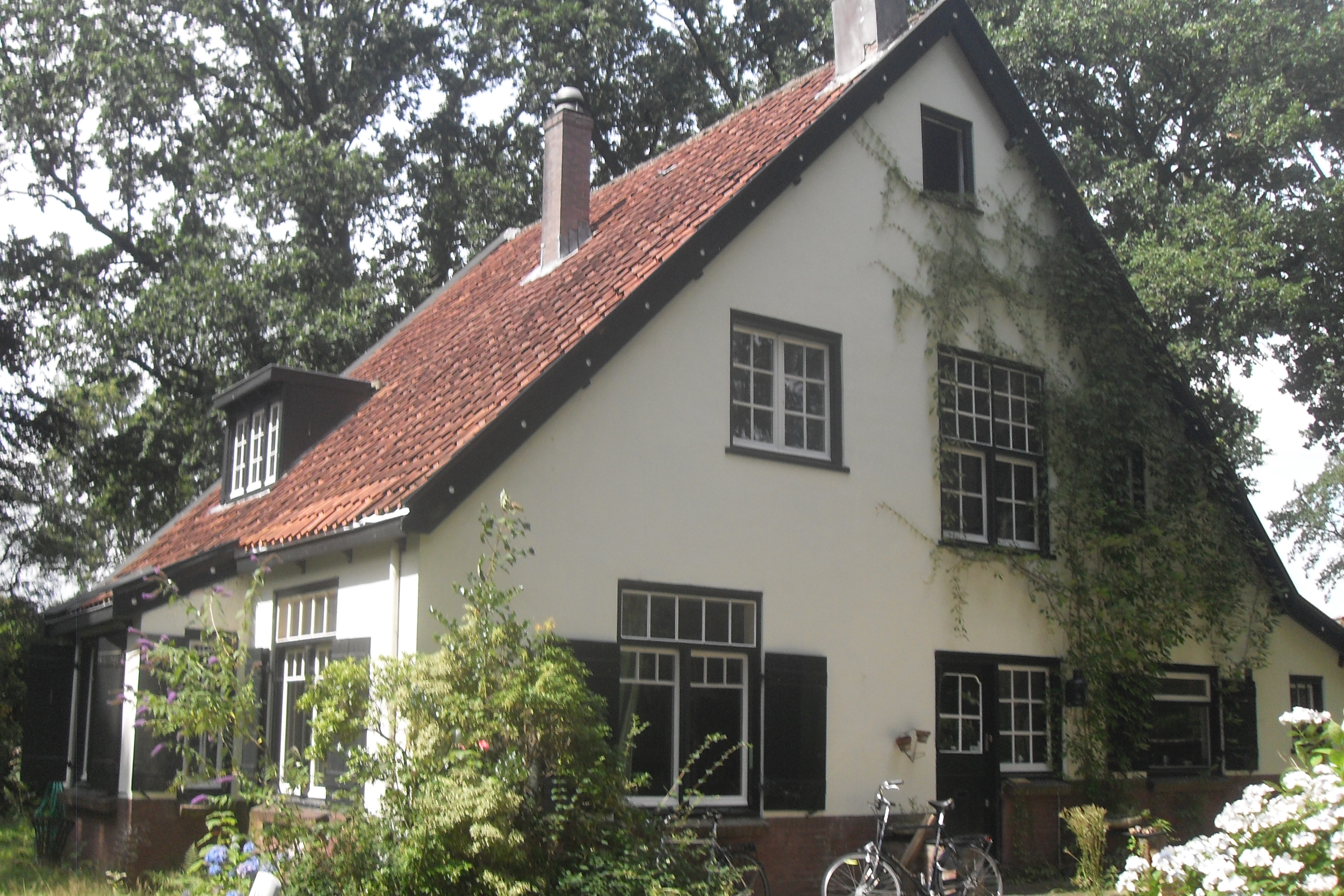
Villa Eikenhof, Bussum

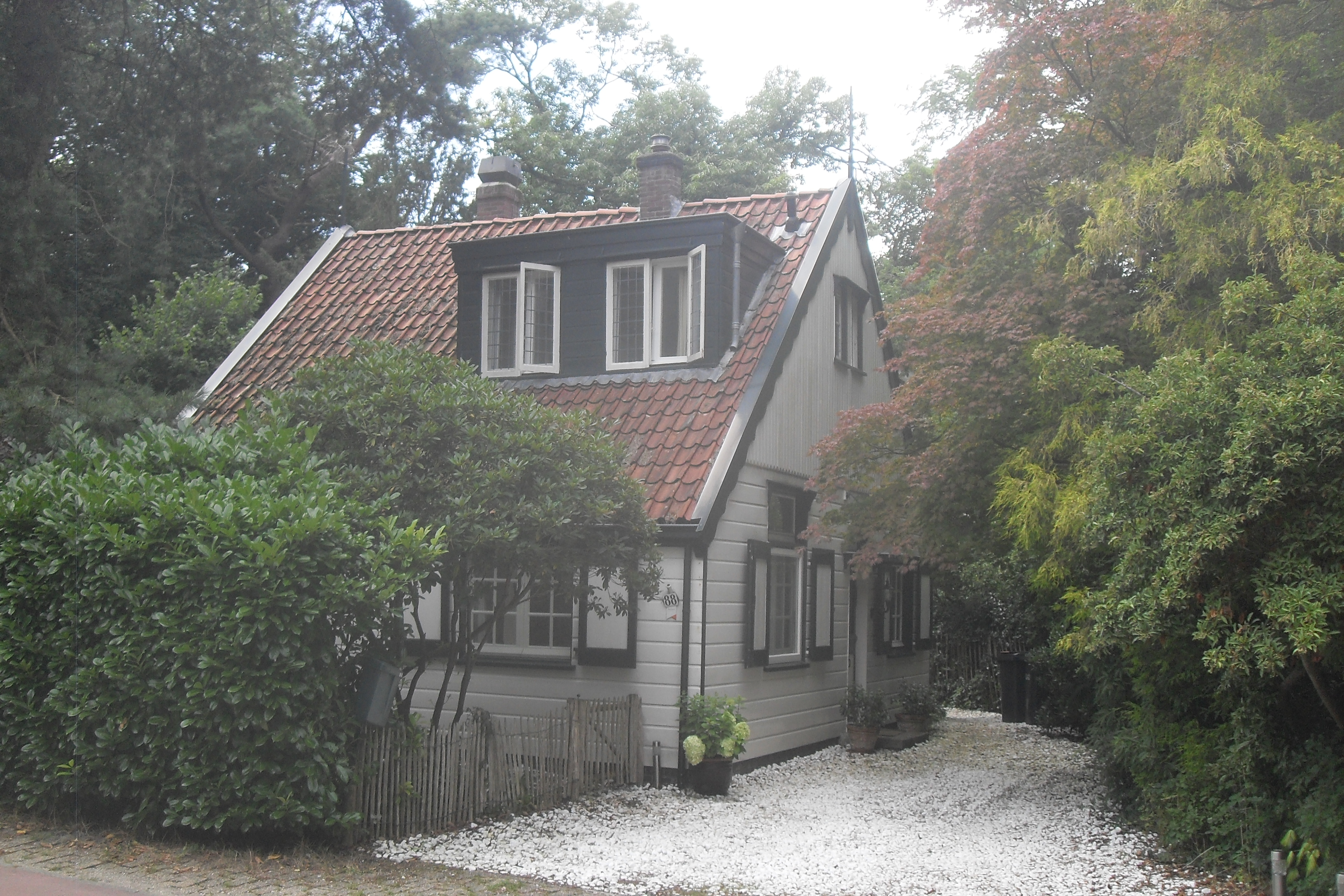
House Boschlust, Bussum

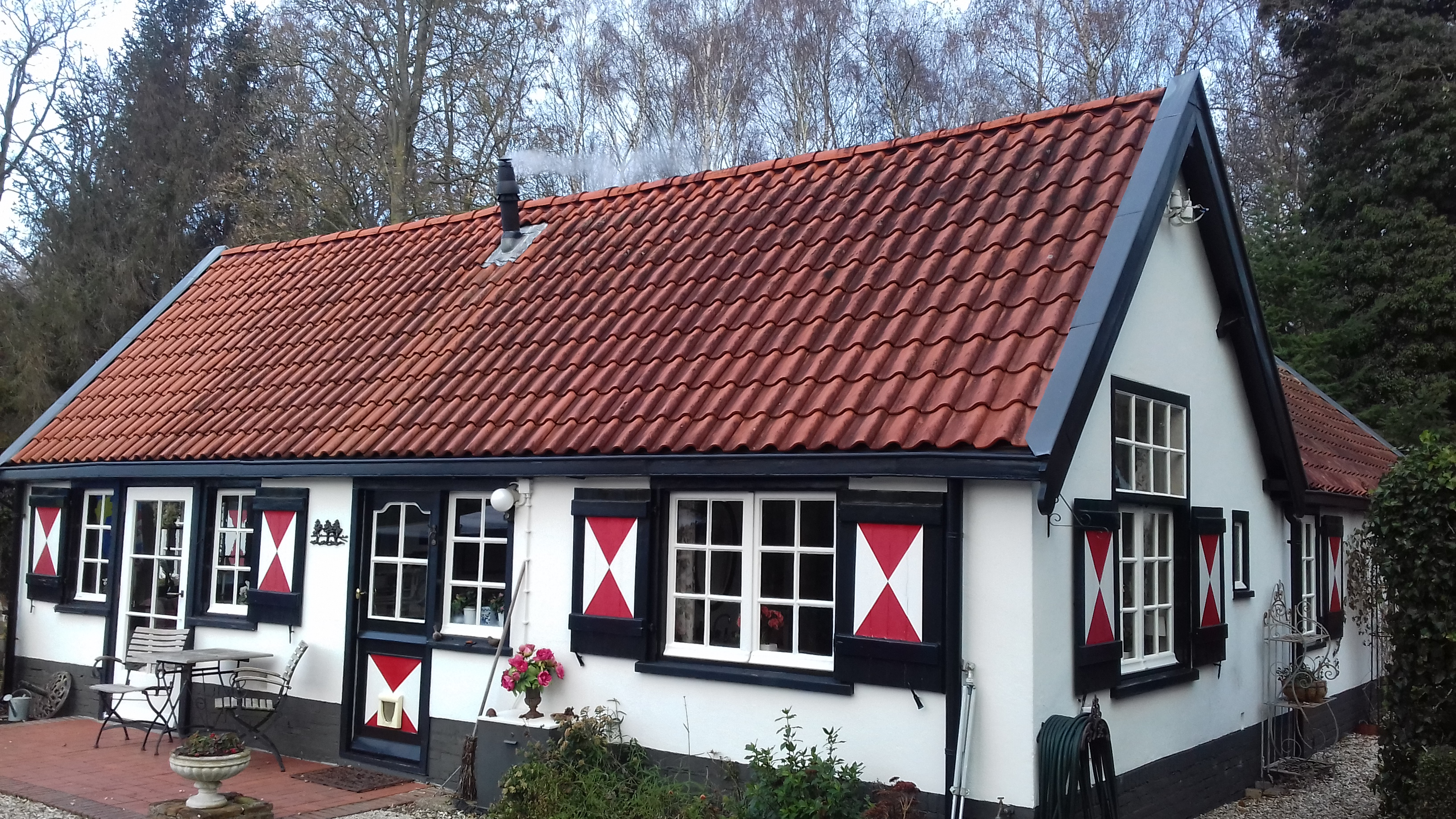
House, Bussum

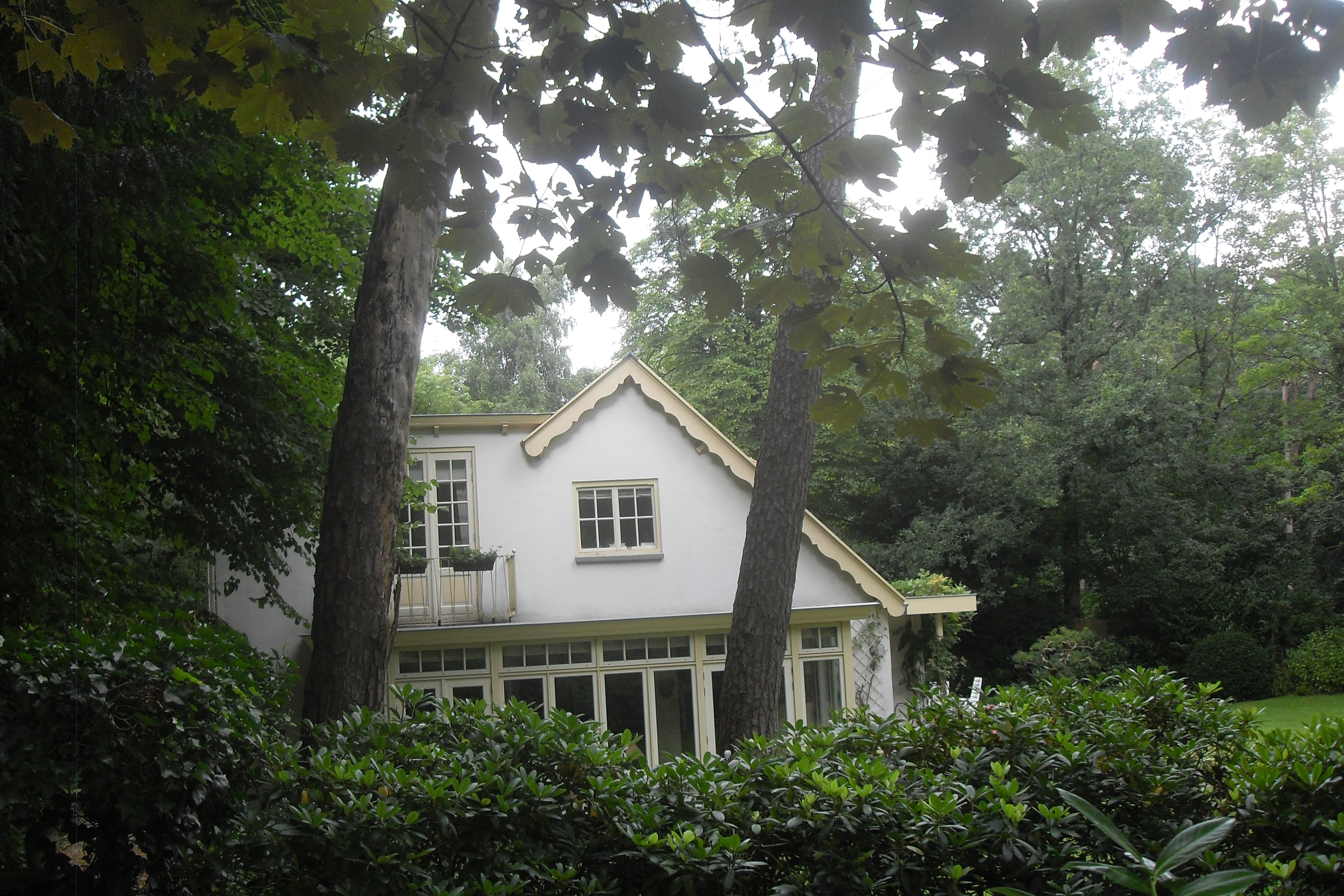
House, Colony Walden

== Literature ==
- J.H.W. Leliman en K. Sluyterman, Het moderne landhuis in Nederland (The Modern Country House in the Netherlands), 1916.
- Dutch Architecture 1893 - 1918, Architectura, Architecture Museum, Publisher Van Gennep Amsterdam 1975, ISBN 9789060123003.
- Walden in Droom en daad, Walden diaries, minutes of Frederik van Eeden et al. 1898-1903, (ed. J.S. De Ley and B. Luger). Publisher Huis aan de Drie Grachten, Amsterdam 1980.
- Nooit gebouwd Nederland (Never built Netherlands), Graphic Netherlands 1980, Idea and composition Cees de Jong, Frank den Oudsten and Willem Schilder, text Cees Nooteboom.
- The Art of Building: From Classicism to Modernity. International Ideas, Dutch Debate 1840-1900, Auke van der Woud 2001.
- Marius Bauer 1867-1932, Oogstrelend Oosters, Chapter 1, Youth pages 20 – 21, André Kraayenga, Waanders books Zwolle 2007, ISBN 978-9462582163.
