= Johan Cohen Gosschalk =

Dutch jurist, graphic artist, and painter

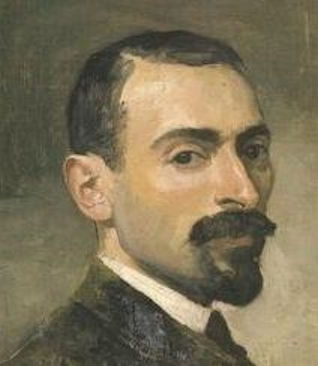
Self-portrait (date unknown)

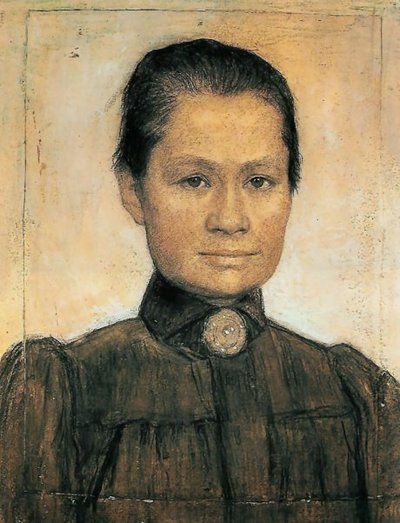
Portrait of Johanna van Gogh-Bonger

Johan Henri Gustaaf Cohen, known as Johan Cohen Gosschalk (3 November 1873, Amsterdam - 18 May 1912, Amsterdam) was a Dutch jurist, graphic artist, and painter. His ancestry was Jewish. His sister, Meta Cohen Gosschalk, was also a well-known painter.

== Biography ==
Cohen's father, Salomon, was a dealer in dairy products. Cohen originally studied law. Between 1897 and 1900, he took private painting lessons from Jan Veth in Bussum. In 1902, he received permission, by royal decree, to add his mother's maiden name to his own. Most of his works were portraits or landscapes. Cohen was a member of Arti et Amicitiae and the Kunstenaarsvereniging Sint Lucas. In addition to painting, he was an art critic and wrote articles for De Kroniek, Elsevier's Geïllustreerd Maandschrift and Onze Kunst.

In 1901, Cohen married Johanna Bonger, the widow of Theo van Gogh, who had died in 1891. They built a villa, named "Eikenhof", in Bussum, but lived there only a short time before moving to Amsterdam. In 1905, Cohen helped organize an exhibition of the works of Vincent van Gogh at the Stedelijk Museum and wrote the introduction to the catalogue. After that, Cohen continued his efforts to make Van Gogh's work more widely known.

Cohen's health deteriorated after 1910 and he spent much of his time bedridden or in a sanatorium. After he died, Johanna held a retrospective exhibition of his work. Later, she resumed using the name Van Gogh-Bonger. In 1913, Cohen's mother, Christina, established a fund for the "Cohen-Gosschalk Prize"; to be awarded to promising students at the Rijksakademie.
