= Andries Bonger =

Dutch art collector (1861–1936)

Andries "Dries" Bonger
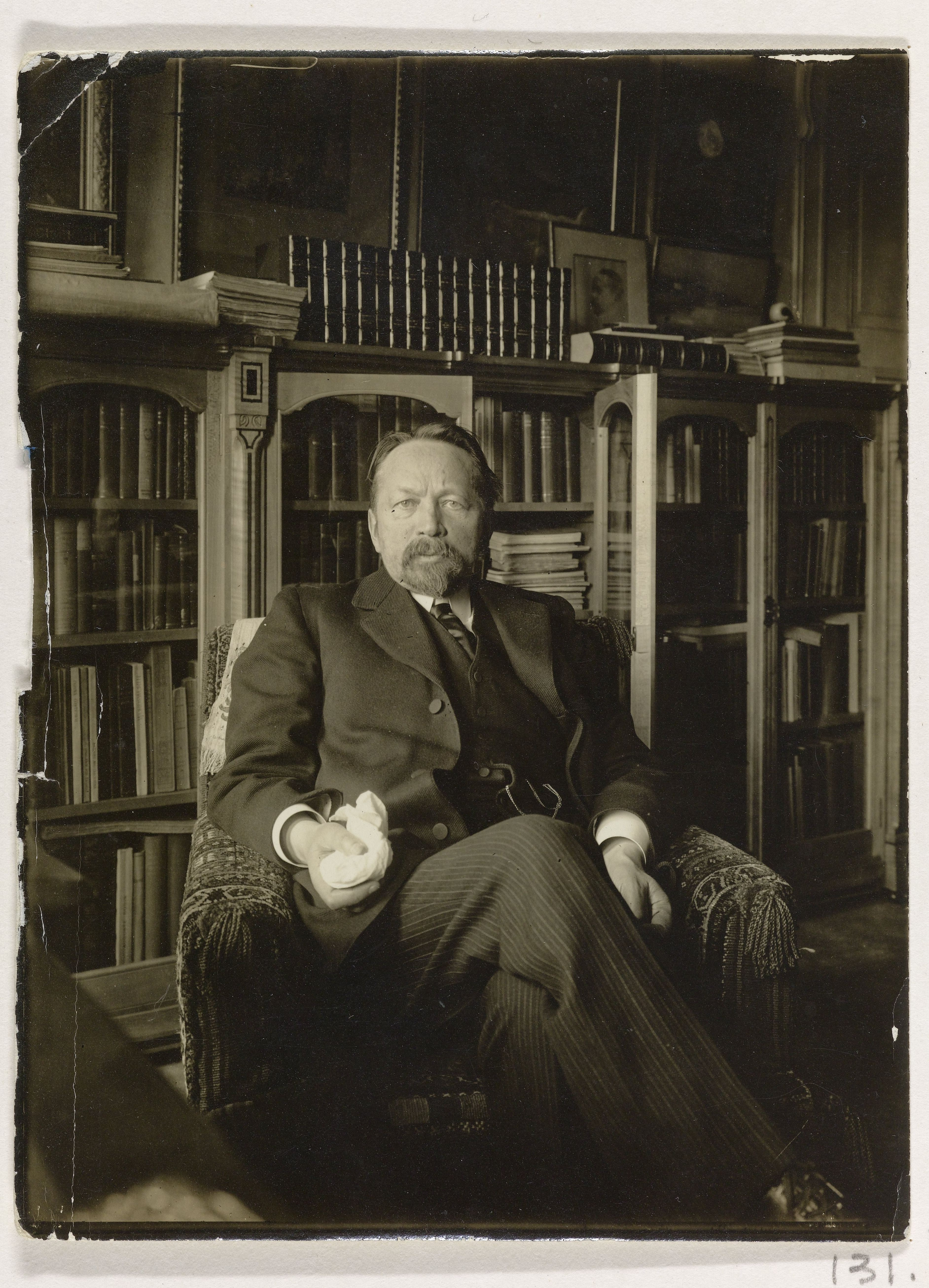
- Andries Bonger
- Born: Andries Bonger; 20 May 1861; Amsterdam, Netherlands
- Died: 20 January 1936 (aged 74)
- Relatives: Johanna van Gogh-Bonger (sister); Willem Bonger (brother); Vincent Willem van Gogh (nephew)

Andries Bonger (20 May 1861 – 20 January 1936) was a Dutch art collector, as well as Johanna van Gogh-Bonger's brother and Theo van Gogh's friend, who later became his brother-in-law.

== Relationship with Theo ==
In December 1879, after finishing a course at the Amsterdam Trade School, Bonger traveled to Paris to work at Geo Wehry, a commodity trading firm that focused on tobacco, coffee, tea, and rubber. In 1881, he became librarian at the Hollandsche Club, an expatriate club in Paris, where he became friends with Theo van Gogh. He later introduced his sister Jo to Theo; they married in Amsterdam in 1889, but he and his wife did not attend the wedding because he thought the wedding cost too much and they could not afford to travel.

Through Theo, he knew Vincent van Gogh, who called him "André" in letters. In a letter that Bonger wrote to his parents on March 31, 1885, he describes Theo van Gogh as having received unexpected news the prior week that his father had died due to a "stroke of apoplexy" after having received a letter the previous day that he was in perfect health. He mentioned that Van Gogh was not very strong, and so this was a very melancholy circumstance. In several letters over the remainder of the year, Bonger comments on a growing appreciation for and friendship with Theo. In 1886, Vincent van Gogh arrived in Paris, which meant that Bonger saw less of Theo. Bonger expressed his concern that Vincent's harshness towards Theo, who had begun to look haggard. Theo met Bonger's parents during a visit to the Netherlands in 1886.

Theo had hoped to open a gallery of his own, with his brother-in-law Andries as a partner. Despite promising talks, it never came to fruition. Theo died six months after his older brother Vincent's death, leaving Andries's sister Jo holding the letters of Vincent to Theo and in control of Vincent's artwork. Andries believed that his younger sister should not have sole say about what became of these remnants of her marriage and attempted to exert his influence over her. She resisted and the close of the siblings were at odds. Andries managed the sales of some of Vincent's artwork whose sale Jo authorized.

== Later life ==
In 1892, he returned to the Netherlands after taking a job with an insurance company based in Hilversum. Around this time, Bonger started collecting art, especially works by Odilon Redon and Émile Bernard, who were his friends. He also owned works by Vincent van Gogh and Paul Cézanne. He is buried at Zorgvlied cemetery in Amsterdam.

== See also ==
- Johanna van Gogh-Bonger
