= Johanna van Gogh-Bonger =

Dutch teacher, editor, translator and art organizer (1862-1925)

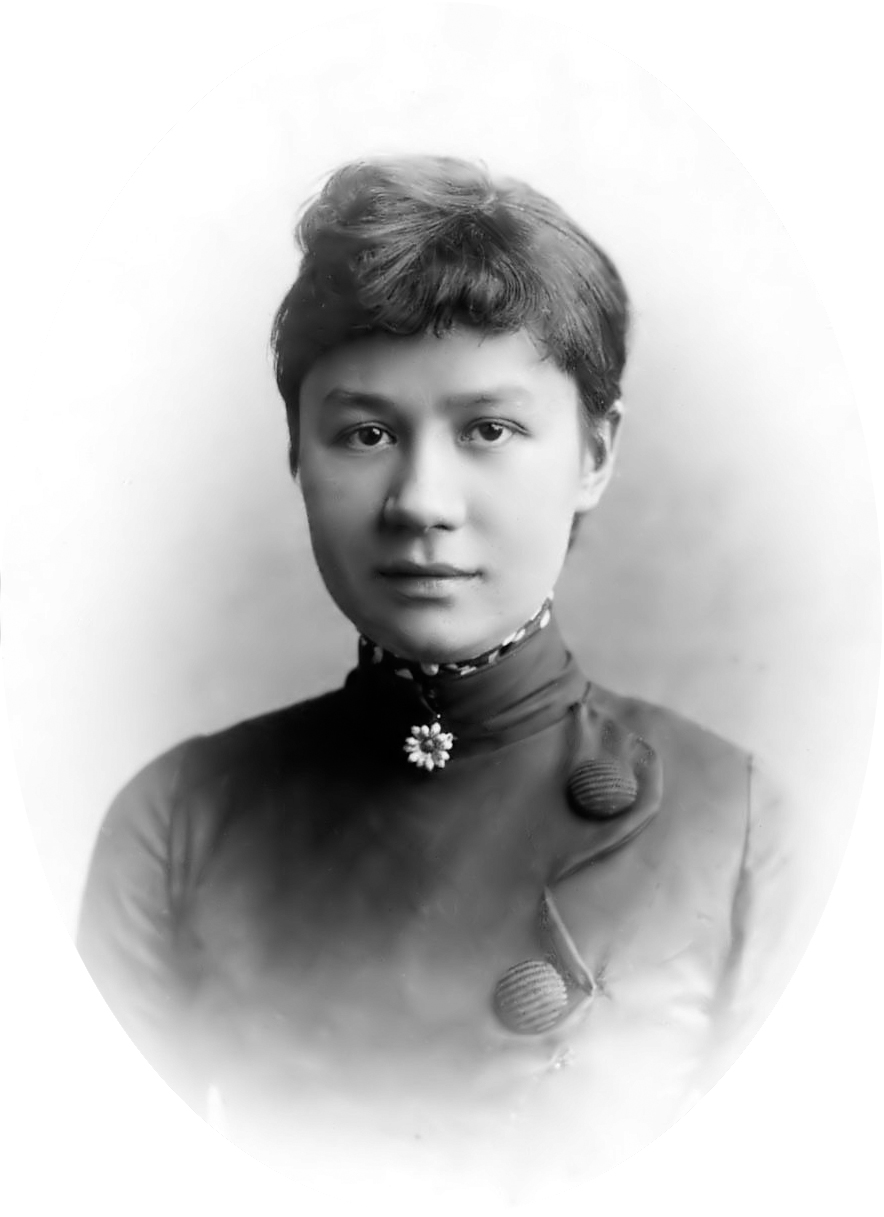
- Van Gogh-Bonger in 1889
- Born: Johanna Gezina Bonger; 4 October 1862; Amsterdam, Netherlands
- Died: 2 September 1925 (aged 62); Laren, Netherlands
- Other name: Jo van Gogh-Bonger
- Occupations: Editor; translator; teacher
- Spouses: Theo van Gogh (m. 1889; died 1891) Johan Cohen Gosschalk (m. 1901; died 1912)
- Children: Vincent Willem van Gogh
- Relatives: Andries Bonger (brother); Willem Bonger (brother)

Johanna Gezina van Gogh-Bonger (4 October 1862 – 2 September 1925) was a Dutch editor who translated the hundreds of letters of her first husband, art dealer Theo van Gogh, and his brother, painter Vincent van Gogh.

Van Gogh-Bonger played a key role in the growth of Vincent van Gogh's posthumous fame.

Johanna and Theo van Gogh's son Vincent Willem (1890–1978), who was named after his uncle, founded the Van Gogh Museum in Amsterdam, which opened in 1973.

== Family and early years ==
Johanna (Jo) Gezina Bonger was born on 4 October 1862 in Amsterdam in the Netherlands. The daughter of Hendrik Christiaan Bonger (1828–1904), an insurance broker, and Hermine Louise Weissman (1831–1905), she was the fifth of seven children. She was especially close to her older brother Andries Bonger (1861–1936). Andries moved to Paris in 1879, and the two regularly exchanged letters. Her youngest brother, Willem Adriaan Bonger (1876–1940), became an important criminologist. The family was musical, holding evening performances of quartets, and Jo (also called "Net") became an accomplished pianist. Unlike her elder sisters, who did household duties, Jo, a "cheerful and lively child", was permitted to further her education by studying English, and earning the equivalent of a college degree. She stayed some months in London, working in the British Museum library. As an adolescent, she came under the influence of the non-conformist writer Multatuli, author of the satirical, nineteenth-century anti-colonial novel Max Havelaar.

From the age of 17, before her marriage to Theo, she kept a detailed diary, which later became an important source for how she helped create Vincent's posthumous fame, and highlighted the role of her late husband.

== Adulthood ==
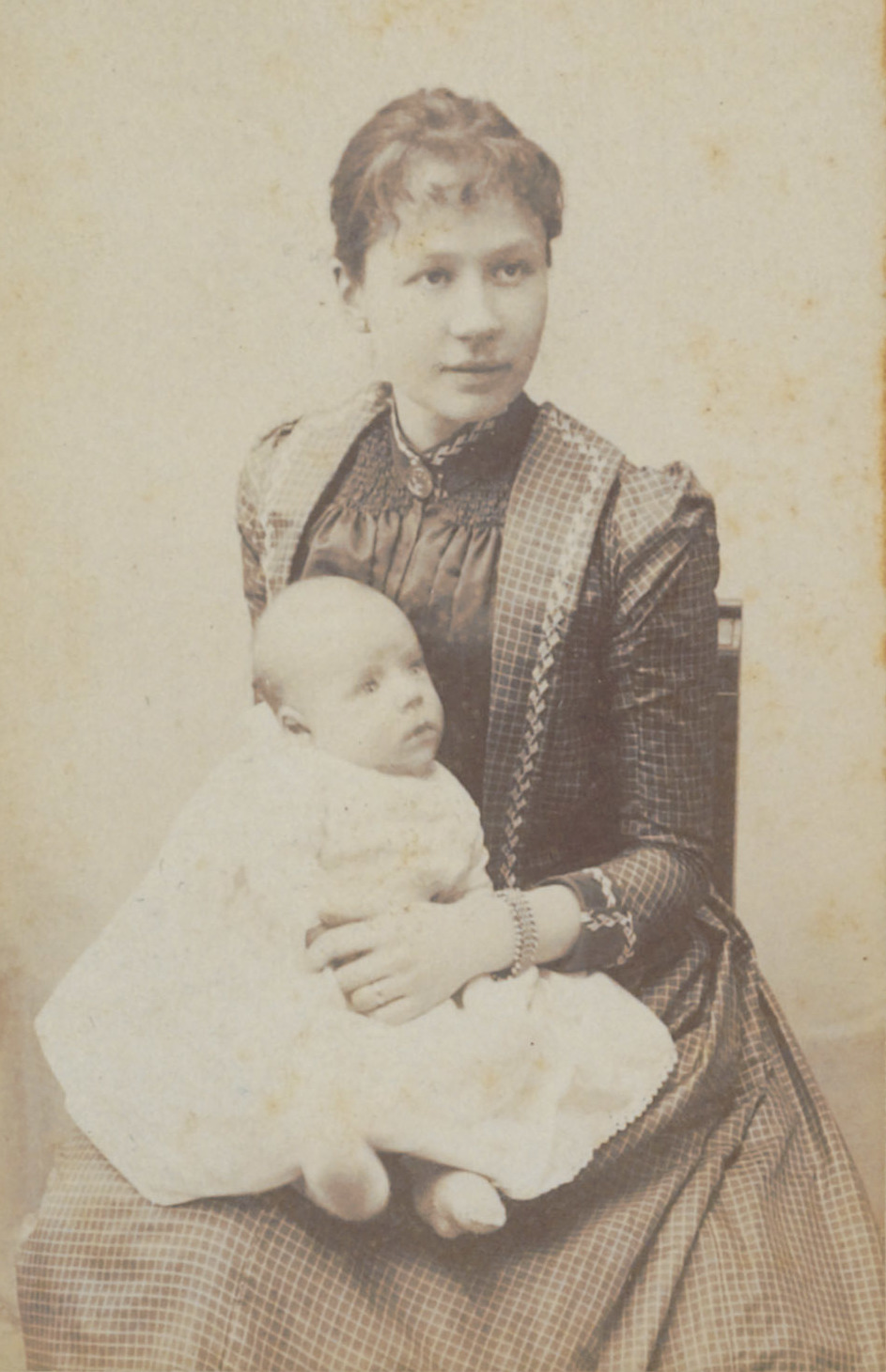
With son Vincent Willem at the studio of photographer Raoul Saisset, 4 Rue Frochot, Paris, 1890

At the age of 22 she became a teacher of English at a boarding school for girls at Elburg, later teaching at the High School for Girls at Utrecht. About this time while in Amsterdam she was introduced by her brother Andries to Theo van Gogh, brother of Vincent. One of the Van Gogh sisters described her as "smart and tender".

=== Marriage to Theo van Gogh ===
Theo became preoccupied with Johanna, and the following year paid a visit to Amsterdam to declare his love. Surprised and annoyed that a man she hardly knew should wish to marry her, she initially rejected him. She accepted his proposal the following year, and they were married in Amsterdam on 17 April 1889. Leaving home in the Netherlands with her parents and siblings and moving to Paris to take up life with her art dealer husband was a major change for her. The couple exchanged many letters prior to their marriage, published as Brief Happiness: The Correspondence of Theo Van Gogh and Jo Bonger, where they got to know each other better. Going into the marriage, Jo knew that the relationship between her future husband and his brother Vincent was strong, so that in marrying Theo, she was also in essence marrying Vincent as well. For years, her husband Theo had supported Vincent's work as an artist, financially and in all other ways.

Theo was infected with syphilis prior to his marriage through visits to prostitutes, but he did not infect Jo or their son Vincent Willem, born on 31 January 1890, nine months after the marriage. They asked Vincent if he would be the baby's godfather, strengthening the bond amongst them all. Shortly after the baby's birth, Vincent visited the family in Paris and he met his namesake. A letter from Johanna to Vincent survives, written during her extended labor with baby Vincent Willem. Theo's younger sister Wil stayed with Jo during her pregnancy and after the baby's birth, helping the new mother. The two had become friends when Jo and Theo were engaged and continued after Vincent's and Theo's deaths.

After Vincent's death, Theo organized an exhibition of his brother's paintings in their Montmartre apartment in Paris. Theo's health collapsed after Vincent's death, which was attributed at the time to his profound grief. Jo attempted to have Theo moved to the Netherlands for treatment, but exigent circumstances made that impossible. She did persuade Dutch author and psychiatrist Frederik van Eeden to come to Paris to attempt treatment using hypnosis. After his visit, Van Eeden wrote glowingly in De Nieuwe Gids about Vincent's paintings, which he had seen in Jo and Theo's apartment. To thank him, Jo gifted him a version of The Sower, which he showed to friends and also wrote about. "Jo had successfully planted the first Van Gogh seed in the Netherlands". With her husband's death six months after Vincent's, Jo was determined to carry on her husband's efforts to establish Vincent's importance as an artist, but she also worked to demonstrate her husband's crucial role in supporting Vincent's life as an artist.

=== Life after Theo's death ===
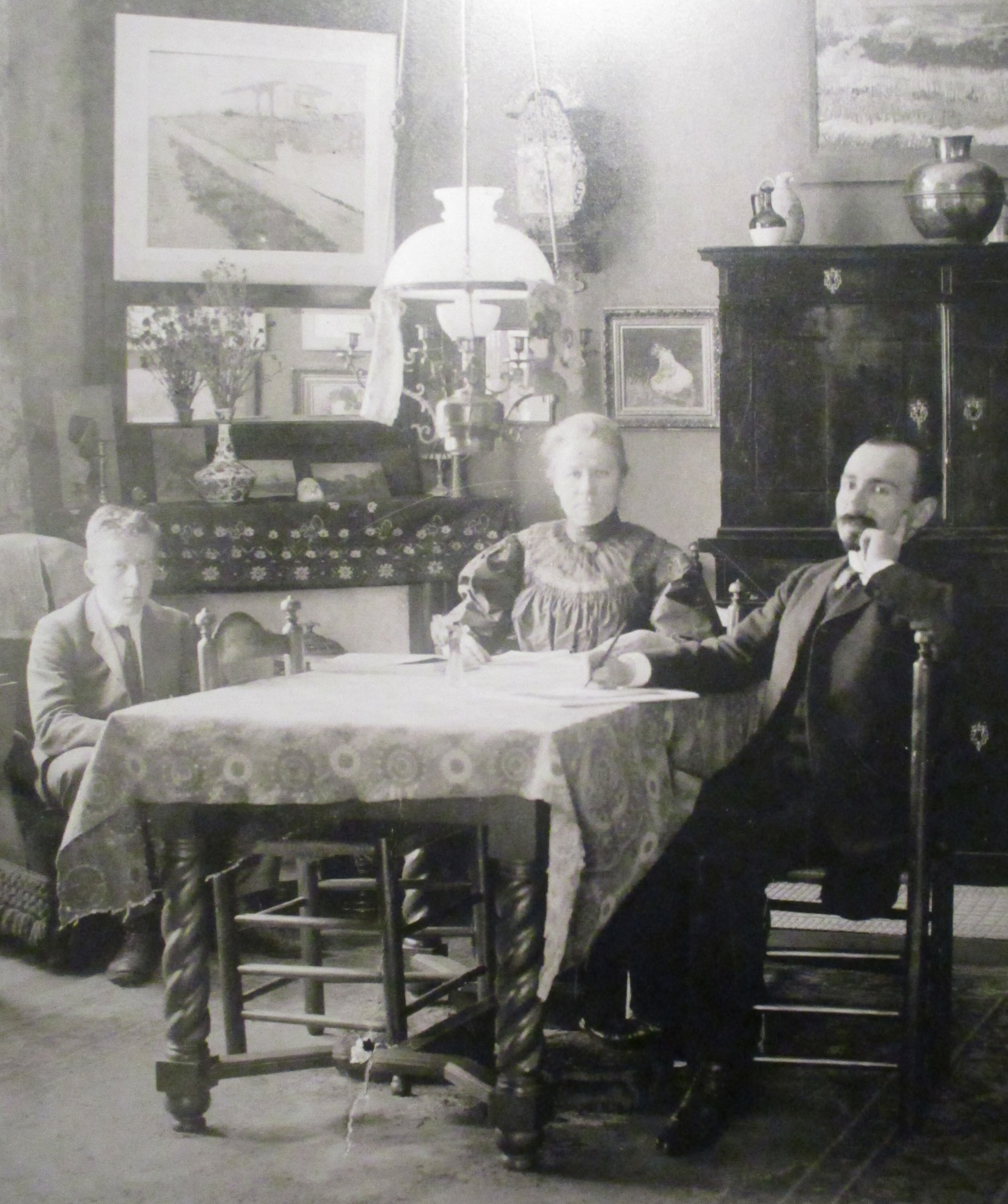
Van Gogh-Bonger with her son and her second husband, Johan Cohen Gosschalk c. 1905

Following Theo's death in January 1891 only a few months after Vincent's, Johanna was left a widow with her infant son to support. She was left with only an apartment in Paris filled with a few items of furniture and about 200 then-valueless works of her brother-in-law Vincent. Although advised to leave the paintings in Paris, a center of the art world, instead she moved back to the Netherlands with the canvases and hundreds of sketches, as well as the large cache of letters from Vincent to her late husband. Although not trained in art herself, during her short marriage she had been on the scene of the lively art world of the Impressionists and post-Impressionists, whose work her late husband had promoted.

In the Netherlands she opened a boarding house in Bussum, a village 25 km from Amsterdam, and began to re-establish her artistic contacts. During her short but fruitful marriage to Theo, she had not kept her diary, but resumed it, intending that her son should read it someday. To earn extra income, she translated short stories from French and English into Dutch. In August 1901, she married Johan Cohen Gosschalk (1873–1912), a Dutch painter ten years younger than she was. Born in Amsterdam, he studied art in Bussum and lived in Jo's boarding house. They were engaged for a year, and it was unclear whether they would marry. They did finally go ahead and wed, making a prenuptial agreement that the property they brought into the marriage would remain separate. Vincent's paintings inherited from Theo's estate remained hers, and those belonging to her son Vincent Willem were also separate. With her marriage, she ceased running her boarding house and moved with her new husband and son to a nearby house, specially designed by the Dutch architect Wilhem Bauer. Her marriage to Cohen, a depressive who preferred solitude, was challenging, and Jo confided to others about its difficulties. Jo's good friend and sister-in-law Wil van Gogh was hospitalized for mental illness for what turned out to be the rest of her life. Jo visited her in the mental hospital and held Vincent's paintings owned by Wil in trust, selling some to pay for her hospitalization. She was widowed again in 1912 and never remarried.

She became involved in feminist causes in this period of her life. She wrote book reviews for feminist publications and became a good friend of feminist journalist Henriëtte van der Meij. She was one of the founding members of a women's socialist movement, the Amsterdam Social-Democratic Women's Propaganda Club, "which set out to improve working-class education and women's working conditions."

=== Promoting Van Gogh's painting and literary achievement in letters ===
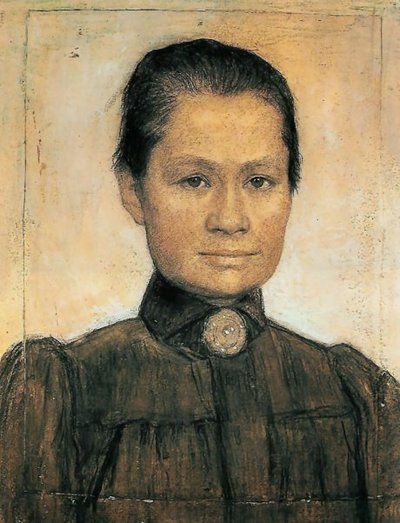
Johanna Bonger, by her second husband Johan Cohen Gosschalk, 1905

She devoted her life to continuing to establish the legacy of Vincent and her late husband Theo. Early in her widowhood, she began a systematic effort to bring attention to Vincent's art and life. For her, the letters and the paintings were a unified package and the way to persuade critics who might dismiss his work was through the letters. In them, Vincent laid out his artistic vision by which those seeing the paintings could better understand them. For the men of the art world, she seemed an uninformed and obsessed woman connected by marriage to the relatively unknown Vincent and Theo van Gogh. In 1892, while organizing an exhibition of Vincent's works, she was harshly criticized by artist Richard Roland Holst:

"Mrs Van Gogh is a charming little woman, but it irritates me when someone gushes fanatically on a subject she knows nothing about, and although blinded by sentimentality still thinks she is adopting a strictly critical attitude. It is schoolgirlish twaddle, nothing more. [...] The work that Mrs Van Gogh would like best is the one that was the most bombastic and sentimental, the one that made her shed the most tears; she forgets that her sorrow is turning Vincent into a god."

Despite the dismissal by the establishment of the art world, she worked tirelessly and successfully to bring art critics and the public to her view of Vincent as a suffering artistic genius both in painting and in literature through his letters. She even won over Holst eventually and he designed the cover of the catalogue to a major exhibition of Vincent's works. She edited the brothers' correspondence, publishing the first volume in Dutch in 1914. She also played a key role in the growth of Vincent's fame and reputation through her strategic lending some of Vincent's work to various early retrospective exhibitions, while retaining ownership.

She stayed in contact with Vincent van Gogh's friend Eugène Boch, to whom she offered his portrait in July 1891. She also stayed in touch with artist Émile Bernard, who helped her to promote Vincent van Gogh's paintings.

The legacy and renown of Vincent van Gogh the long-suffering artist began to spread in the years after his death, first in the Netherlands, and Germany and then throughout Europe. His deep connection with his younger brother Theo was documented in numerous letters they exchanged from August 1872 onwards. Van Gogh-Bonger published the letters in three volumes in 1914. She initially worked closely with German art dealers and publishers Paul Cassirer and his cousin Bruno to organize exhibitions of Van Gogh's paintings in Berlin and in 1914 to publish the first volume of the Letters to Theo. Publication of the letters helped spread the compelling mystique of Vincent van Gogh, the intense and dedicated painter who suffered for his art and died young.

Jo's life revolved around promoting Vincent's posthumous importance. Her sister-in-law Elisabeth (Lies) van Gogh published a personal remembrance of Vincent in 1910, which was translated into English, French, and German, indicating the perceived demand for information about Vincent's life. Writing from memory, Lies did not get all the facts straight. Jo had reservations about Lies' memoir; its publication just before Jo's planned publication of her edition of Vincent's letters to Theo caused a rift between the two women. When Jo's edition of the letters was published in 1914, all mentions of Lies were eliminated. Lies renewed the conflict, criticizing Jo for publishing letters with such intimate details and family secrets and accusing Jo of betraying the memory of the brothers for financial gain. In a letter, Lies van Gogh referred to Jo as "Mrs. Cohen Gosschalk", using Jo's name following her second marriage, seemingly an attempt to undermine Jo's standing as an advocate for the Van Gogh brothers. Jo's son Vincent Willem conveyed to Lies' children his mother's regret about the end of the women's friendship.

In 1914, Jo moved Theo's remains from Utrecht to Auvers-sur-Oise, interring them next to Vincent's grave with matching tombstones. Her son Vincent Willem and his fiancée were present at the reburial. A sprig of ivy taken from the garden of Dr Paul Gachet carpets both graves to this day. The graves became a pilgrimage site shortly thereafter.

Understanding the necessity of winning Americans' appreciation of Vincent's art, Jo saw translating the letters to English and actively cultivating attention to his talents in New York as important. She spent three years in New York, living on the Upper West Side and in Queens from 1915 to 1919, where she began the work of translating Vincent's letters into English. She was successful in attracting favorable attention for Vincent's work, mounting a show on Fifth Avenue. After World War I ended, in 1919 she returned to Amsterdam.

== Later life and death ==
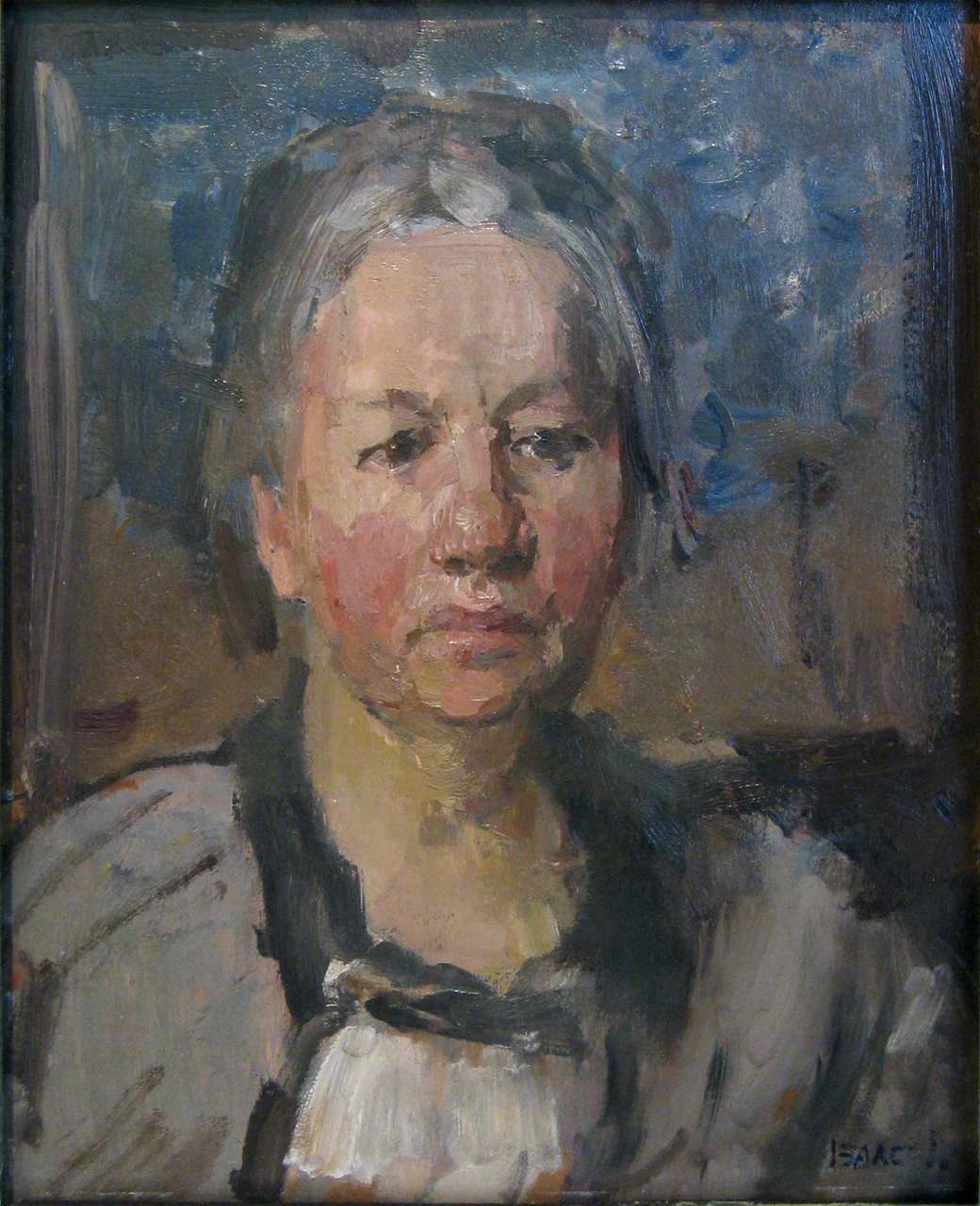
Posthumous portrait in oil, Isaac Israëls, commissioned by her son Vincent shortly after her death

She had been in ill health for some time before her death, suffering from Parkinson's disease. Although ill, she continued right up to her death to manage the sales of Vincent's works. She died on 2 September 1925, at the age of 62, in her country home in Laren, Netherlands. At the time of her death, she was still engaged in translating 526 of Vincent's letters into English. In her obituary, De Proletarische Vrouw on 10 September 1925: "She always apologized for not being more active in the [Socialist] movement. She would say that bringing her son up properly was also a good thing to do for society. 'So that has been my main work.'"

Following her death, her son Vincent Willem van Gogh inherited the collection of some 400 paintings and many more drawings, and the Van Gogh brothers' letters, and the voluminous documentation of Jo's business dealings. The inventory of her estate shows that in addition to Van Gogh's paintings and letters, she also had works by her late second husband, Johan Cohen Gosschalk. Her strategy of retaining his best works and controlled selling of others meant that a significant collection remained in family hands. Her son and grandson continued her work to shore up the legacy of his uncle Vincent and father Theo, resulting in the Dutch government's construction of the Van Gogh Museum in Amsterdam.

== In popular culture ==
Vincent van Gogh as a subject in popular culture is well known, but recently Jo van Gogh-Bonger has also been a focus.

=== Novels ===
- Cauchi, Caroline (2023). Mrs Van Gogh. London: One More Chapter. ISBN 978-0-00-852451-7. OCLC 1351683901. [https://books.google.com/books?id=_XJwEAAAQBAJ Partial preview at Google Books.
- Cooperstein, Claire (1995). Johanna: A novel of the van Gogh family. New York: Scribner. ISBN 978-0-684-80234-3. OCLC 604738644 – via Internet Archive.
- Fernandez, Joan (2025). Saving Vincent: A Novel of Jo Van Gogh. Berkeley, CA: She Writes Press. ISBN 978-1-64742-871-6. OCLC 1499719985.
- Molnar, Marta (2022). Secret Life of Sunflowers. Marta Molnar. ISBN 978-1-940627-56-4. OCLC 1395955291.
- Piazza, Jo (2026). The Parisian Heist. New York: Dutton. ISBN 979-8-217-04649-2. OCLC 1603504188, 1600522953.
- Sánchez, Camilo (2012). La viuda de los Van Gogh (in Spanish). Argentina: Edhasa. ISBN 978-987-628-190-4. OCLC 862179543.

=== Films ===
- As of 2024, an English adaptation, Jo, The Van Goghs' Widow, based on Camilo Sánchez's Spanish-language novel, is being developed by Cinema7.

=== Theatre ===
Jo van Gogh-Bonger has also been the subject of theatrical productions. A one-woman show by actress Muriel Nussbaum, Van Gogh and Jo, was performed at Fairfield University in Connecticut in 2005. Mrs. Van Gogh, a play by Geoff Allen, who previously authored the play Vincent and Theo, was performed in 2012 at the University of Auckland in New Zealand, with a reviewer panning it as "Wikipedia for the stage", lacking in emotion and failing to convey why she spent a lifetime promoting Vincent's work. She also appeared as a major character in the 2018 pop-rock musical Starry by Dahan and D'Angelo. The musical is based primarily on the letters published by van Gogh-Bonger following Vincent and Theo van Gogh's deaths.

== See also ==
- List of works by Vincent van Gogh, promoted by Jo van Gogh-Bonger
