= Marius Bauer =

Dutch artist (1867-1932)

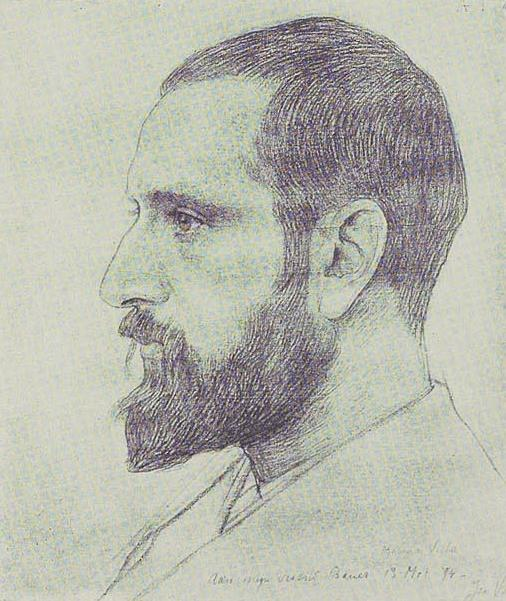
- Marius Bauer; portrait by Jan Veth (1894)
- Born: 25 January 1867; The Hague, Netherlands
- Died: 18 July 1932 (aged 55); Amsterdam, Netherlands
- Known for: Painting, etching and lithographs
- Movement: Orientalist scenes

Marius Alexander Jacques Bauer (25 January 1867 – 18 July 1932) was a Dutch painter, etcher and lithographer, best known for his Oriental scenes. His style was largely Impressionistic, although it also derived to some extent from the Hague School. Many of his works were based on photographs he bought during his travels, some of which were by famous photographers such as Félix Bonfils.

== Biography ==
He was born in The Hague. His older brother Willem Cornelius Bauer was an architect. Their father was a stage painter who encouraged his son's early interest in drawing. From 1878 to 1885, he studied at the Royal Academy of Art, under the direction of Jan Philip Koelman, but thought his approach was too conservative and left without graduating. While there, his works were awarded several medals and he received a stipend from King William III, which enabled him to study independently.

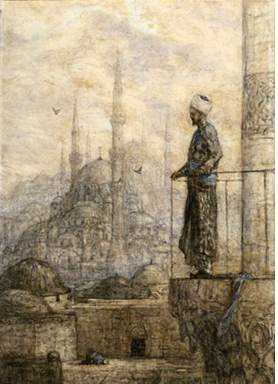
Call to Prayer

In 1888, he made a study trip to Istanbul, financed by the art dealership, Van Wisselingh & Co., and decided to make Orientalism his principal subject. Later, he made numerous trips to Morocco, Algeria, Egypt, India, Ceylon and the Dutch East Indies, sketching and collecting items for Van Wisselingh. He also worked as an illustrator for the short-lived literary journal, De Kroniek, attending the coronation of Tsar Nicholas II on its behalf. Bauer made two trips to India, which influenced his Orientalist works. During his first visit in 1897–98, he arrived in Bombay and traveled through Benaras, Agra, Gwalior, Mathura, Delhi, Bharatpur, Jaipur, Udaipur, Ajmer, Palitana, Baroda, and Hyderabad. He revisited India in 1924–25.

In 1894, he won a first-class medal at the Exposition Internationale d'Anvers. Two years later, he was awarded the Willink van Collenprijs. He received the Grand Prix at the Exposition Universelle (1900). In 1902 he married the painter Jo Stumpff, one of the Amsterdamse Joffers. This was followed by a successful showing at the Louisiana Purchase Exposition. He would continue to exhibit regularly throughout Europe and North America.

In 1900, he was named a Ridder in the Order of Orange-Nassau. Six years later, he was upgraded to an Officer for his contributions to the Rembrandt Tri-centennial. In 1911, King Albert I of Belgium awarded him the Order of the Crown and, in 1927, he became a Ridder in the Order of the Netherlands Lion. He was a long-standing member of the Pulchri Studio and Arti et Amicitiae. In 1930, he became an honorary member of the Senefelder Club. Two years later, he died of a stroke. A street is named after him in the neighborhood of streets dedicated to 19th- and 20th-century Dutch painters in Overtoomse Veld, Amsterdam.

In 1996, the "Bauer Documentatie Stichting" (BDS) was established. Its goal is to raise awareness of his works and do more research on the sources of his paintings.

== Selected works ==
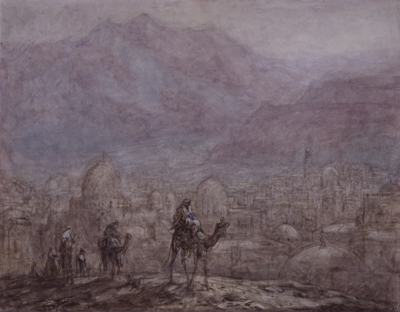
Camel Riders in the Mountains

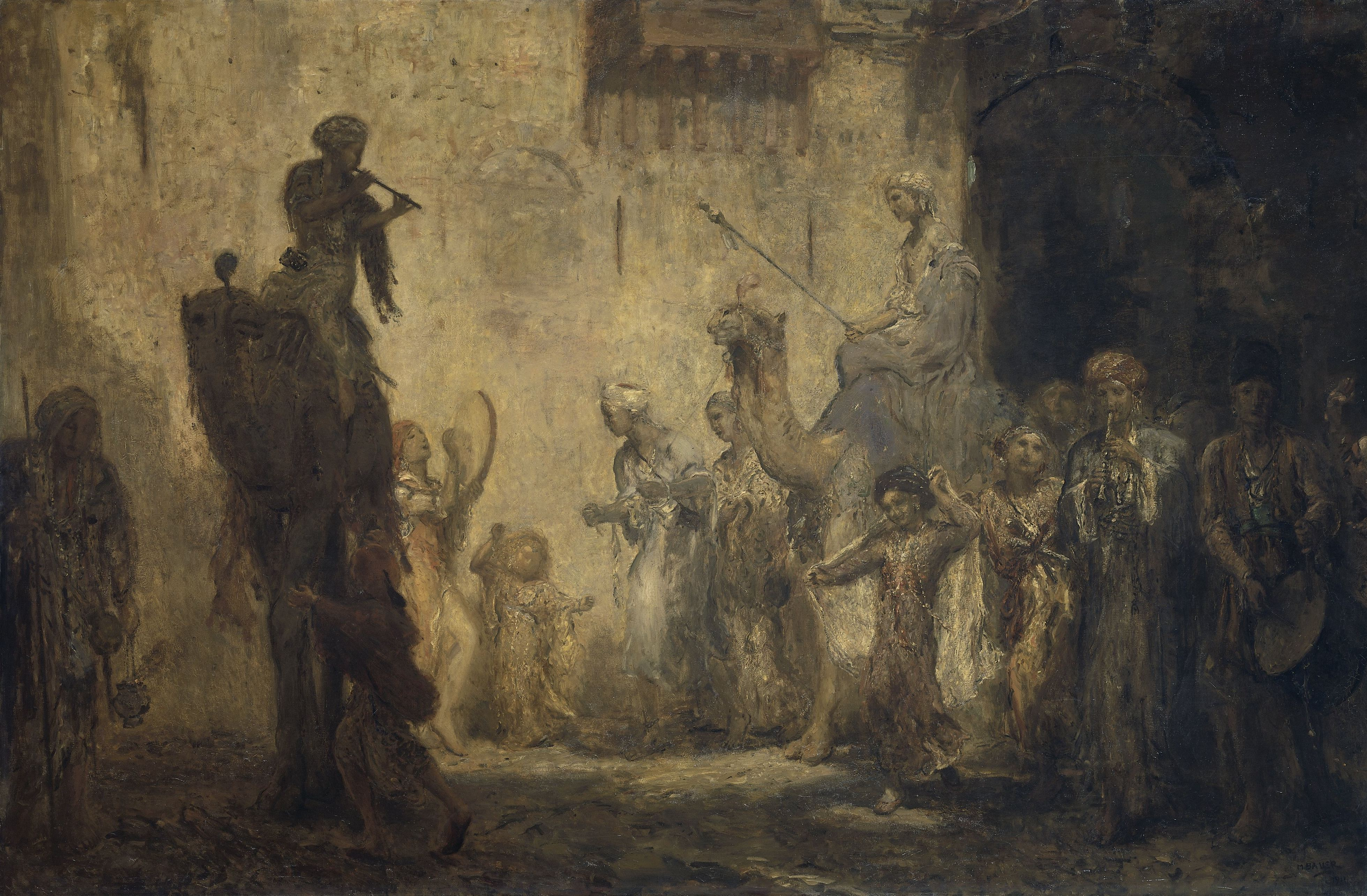
Oriental Wedding

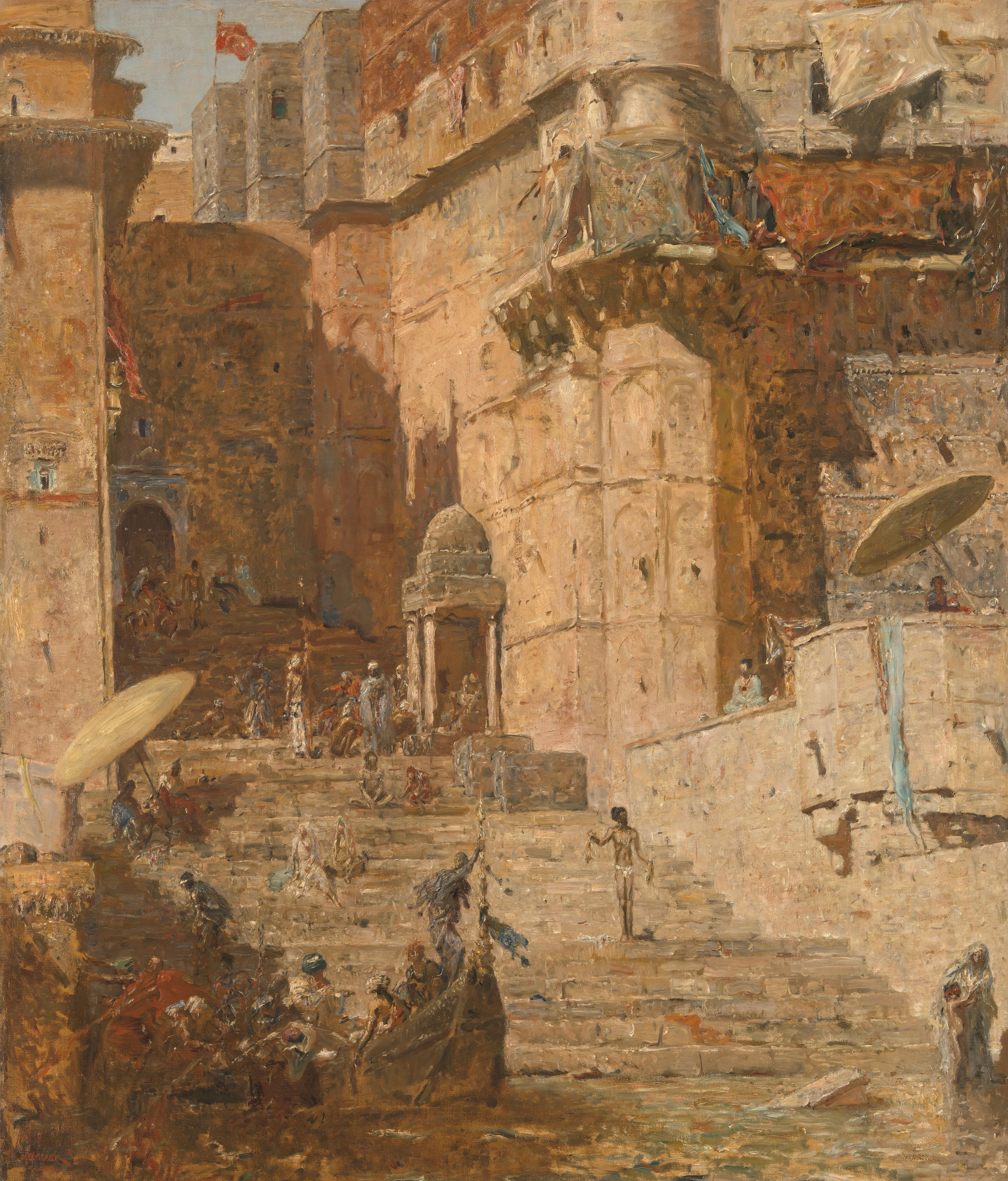
Benares

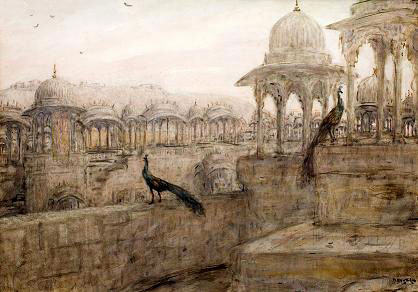
Dome with Peacocks

== See also ==
- List of Orientalist artists
- Orientalism
