= Theo van Gogh (art dealer) =

Dutch art dealer (1857–1891)

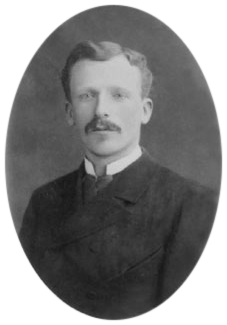
- Van Gogh in 1888
- Born: Theodorus van Gogh; 1 May 1857; Groot-Zundert, Netherlands
- Died: 25 January 1891 (aged 33); Utrecht, Netherlands
- Cause of death: Dementia paralytica
- Occupation: Art dealer
- Known for: Art collector, art dealer; financial supporter of brother Vincent van Gogh with whom he exchanged hundreds of letters
- Spouse: Johanna Bonger (m. 1889)
- Children: Vincent Willem van Gogh
- Relatives: Vincent van Gogh (brother); Cor van Gogh (brother); Wil van Gogh (sister); Theo van Gogh (great-grandson); Lieuwe van Gogh (great-great-grandson)

Theodorus van Gogh (Dutch: [teːjoːˈdoːrʏs ˈteːjoː vɑŋ ˈɣɔx]; (Note: In isolation, van is pronounced [vɑn].) 1 May 1857 – 25 January 1891) was a Dutch art dealer and a younger brother of Vincent van Gogh. His support of his older brother's artistic ambitions and well-being allowed Vincent to devote himself entirely to painting. As an art dealer, Van Gogh played a crucial role in introducing contemporary French art to the public.

Van Gogh died at the age of 33, six months after his brother's death at age 37. Van Gogh owned almost all of his brother's artwork. His widow, Johanna van Gogh-Bonger, worked to promote the work of Vincent and keep the memory of her husband alive. In 1914, Van Gogh's remains were buried next to those of his brother Vincent.

== Early life ==
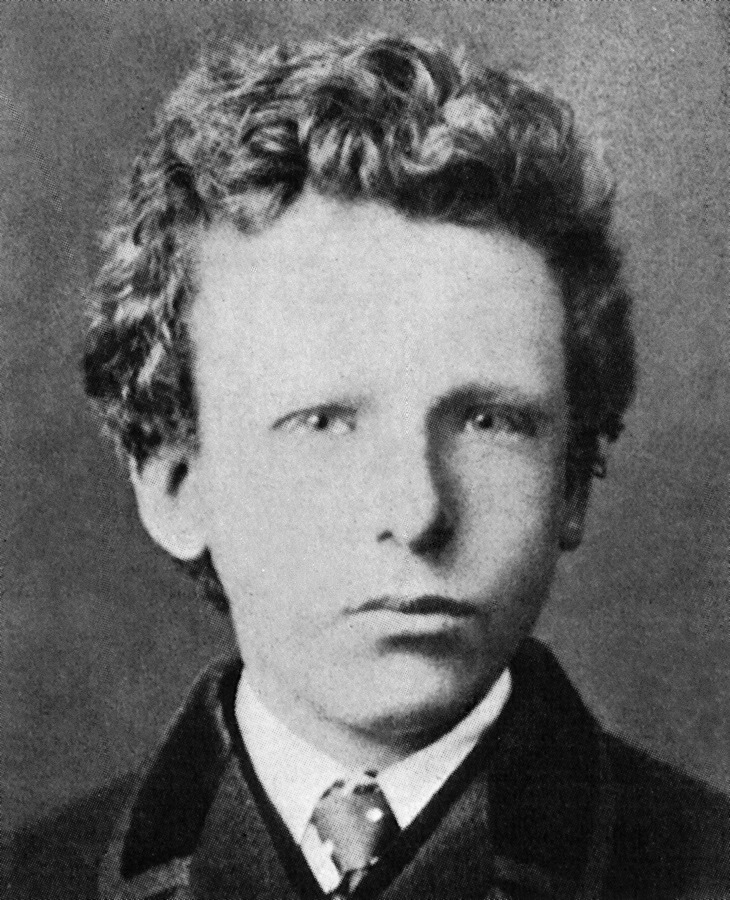
Theo van Gogh in 1873. This photograph was believed to have been of Vincent, but in 2018 was reassigned to Theo.

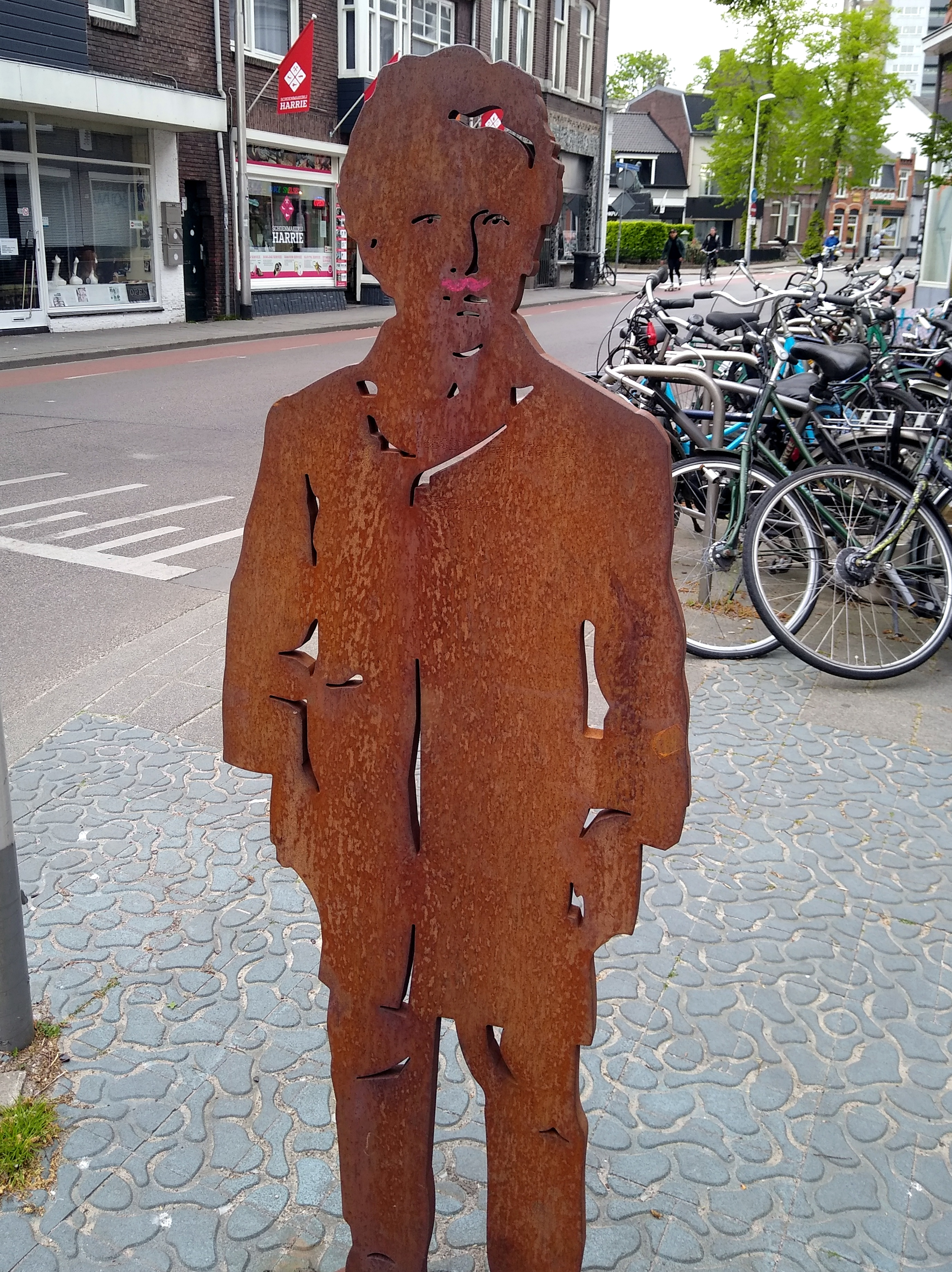
Sculpture of young Theo, mistakenly considered to represent Vincent, Tilburg (Netherlands)

Theodorus van Gogh was born on 1 May 1857 in the village of Groot-Zundert in the province of North Brabant, Netherlands.

He was the son of Theodorus van Gogh and Anna Cornelia Carbentus. He had two brothers, Vincent and Cor, and three sisters, Wil, Elisabeth and Anna.

== Business career ==
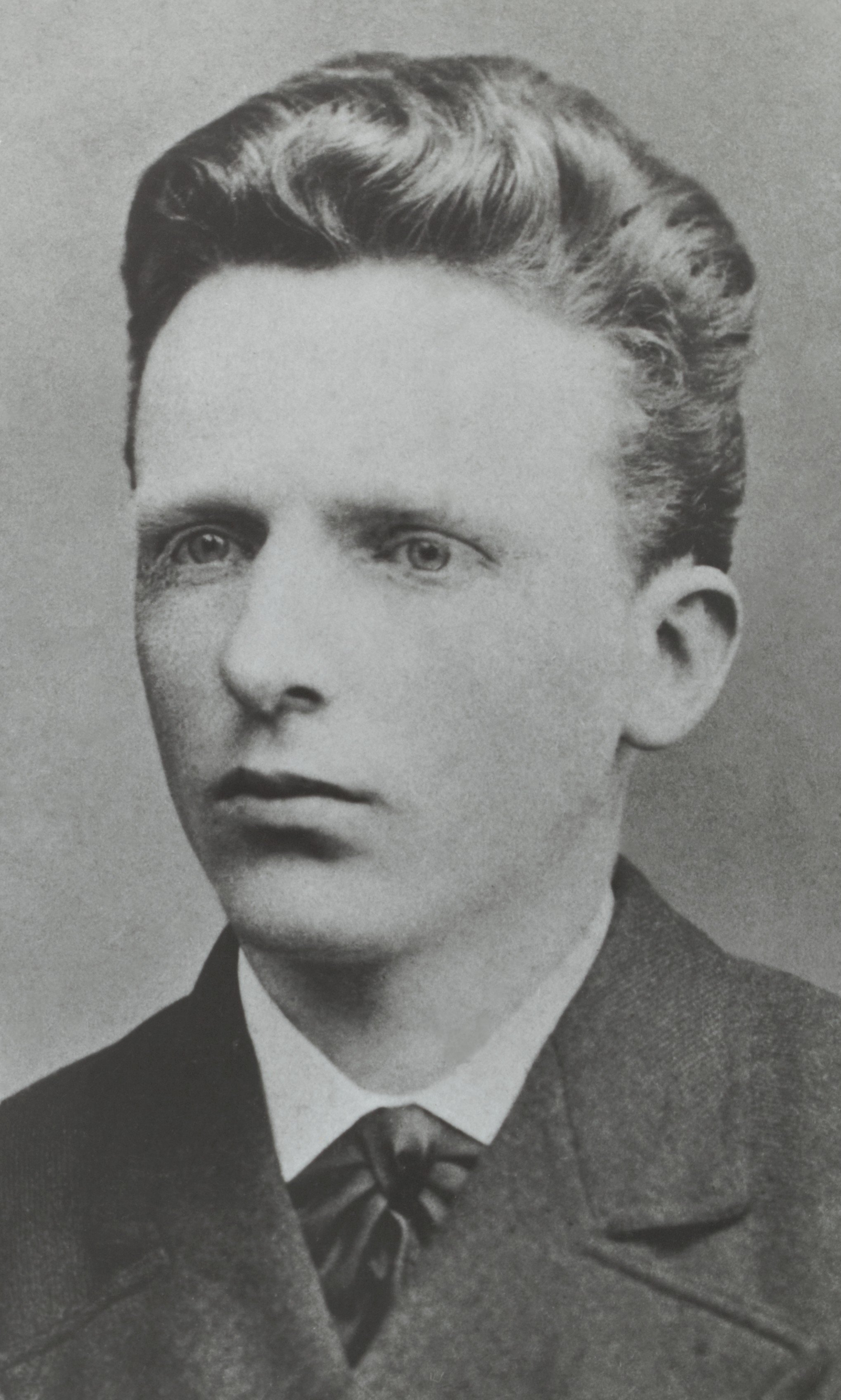
Theo van Gogh in 1878

Van Gogh worked for some years at the Dutch office of the Parisian art dealers Goupil & Cie in The Hague. Van Gogh joined the Brussels office on 1 January 1873 as their youngest employee. After he was transferred to the London office, he moved to the office in The Hague, where he became a successful art dealer. By 1884, he was transferred to the Paris main office, which in 1884 took the name of Boussod, Valadon & Cie. Beginning in the winter of 1880–1881, he sent painting materials as well as monthly financial support to his brother Vincent, who was living in Belgium and soon moved to the Netherlands.

== Personal life ==
In Paris, Van Gogh met Andries Bonger and his sister Johanna. He was quite taken with her and hoped to marry her. At the time, she was in a relationship that she hoped would lead to marriage. When it did not, she reconsidered Van Gogh's proposal. They married in Amsterdam on 17 April 1889. During their short engagement, they had an extensive correspondence, later published as Brief Happiness, in which they discussed practical matters of setting up married life together, but Van Gogh also conveyed strength and the importance of his bond with Vincent. The couple moved to Paris, where their apartment became a venue for socializing with artists and members of the artistic community. Their son Vincent Willem was born in Paris on 31 January 1890. On 8 June, the family visited Vincent, who was living near Paris in Auvers-sur-Oise.

His brother Vincent died on 29 July 1890 at age 37 after shooting himself with a revolver. Theo suffered from dementia paralytica, now understood as late-stage neurosyphilis, and his health declined rapidly after Vincent's death. Unable to take the loss of his brother, he died six months later at age 33, in Den Dolder.

Van Gogh's great-grandson, also named Theo van Gogh, was a film director, who was murdered on the streets of Amsterdam in 2004 by an Islamic extremist after making a short film critical of the treatment of women in Islamic culture.

== Relationship with Vincent ==
Van Gogh admired his elder brother Vincent for his whole life, but communicating with him proved to be difficult, even before Vincent became an artist. The communication between both brothers suffered from diverging definitions of standards, and it was evidently Theo who kept on writing letters. Vincent did not keep all the letters Theo sent, but Theo kept every scrap of correspondence from his brother (651 letters addressed to Theo in total). Most of Vincent's replies survived but only 32 of Theo's remain. Theo was often concerned about Vincent's mental condition and he was amongst the few who understood his brother. It is known that Theo helped Vincent maintain his artist lifestyle by giving him money. He also helped Vincent pursue his life as an artist through his unwavering emotional support and love. The majority of Theo's letters and communications with Vincent are filled with praise and encouragement. Vincent would send Theo sketches and ideas for paintings, along with accounts of his day-to-day experiences, to the delight and eager attention of Theo.

=== Dealer and artist ===
While Van Gogh is best known for being the brother of Vincent van Gogh and one of his major roles in art was his influence on Vincent's career, Van Gogh himself made many important contributions. Van Gogh played a vital role in the introduction of contemporary Dutch and French art to the public: Van Gogh was instrumental in the popularity of Impressionist artists such as Claude Monet and Edgar Degas by persuading his employers, Goupil & Cie, to exhibit and buy their works.

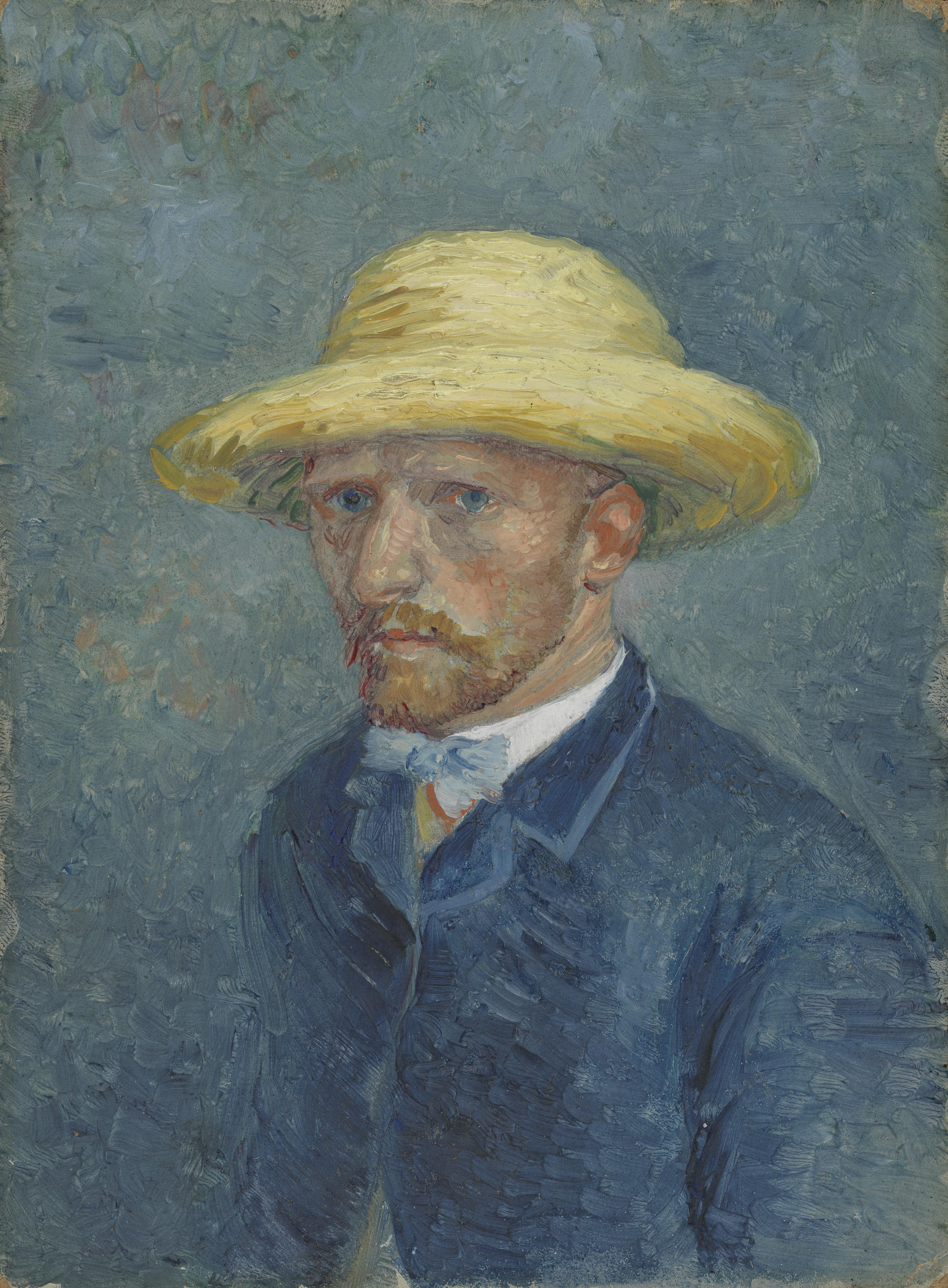
Possible portrait of Theo by Vincent van Gogh; it was once considered to be another self portrait of Vincent, but was re-attributed in 2011 as Theo.

In 1886, Theo invited Vincent to live with him in Paris, and from March they shared an apartment in Montmartre. Theo introduced Vincent to Paul Gauguin and in 1888 he persuaded Gauguin to join Vincent, who had moved to Arles. Theo not only conspired with Vincent as the liaison between Vincent and Gauguin, but was the deciding factor in his move to Arles, seeing as it was Theo van Gogh who planned and eventually committed to supporting them both financially. Theo paid for their living and professional expenses, as well as for the travel expenses Gauguin accumulated to get from Pont-Aven, Brittany, to Arles. Theo was equally the one with whom Gauguin communicated when his relationship with Vincent turned volatile and unmanageable, notably the severing of the ear fiasco. Theo was the source of stability and the intermediate between the two artists and allowed them to create prolifically for a couple of months (63 days); paintings that would otherwise not have survived.

Competing with Paul Durand-Ruel and Georges Petit, the young dealer was to take over an important stake in this market. In 1888, he exhibited ten paintings by Claude Monet from Antibes. Theo also had close relations with Camille Pissarro, and in the autumn of 1888, he presented a few of the painter's latest works, eventually devoting an exhibit to him in 1890. Edgar Degas allowed him to set up a small exhibition of his nudes in January 1888, and an exhibition of a selection of his works in 1889. Theo was also interested in Alfred Sisley, Pierre-Auguste Renoir, and other "moderns" such as Paul-Albert Besnard, Eugène Carrière, and Jean-François Raffaëlli.

=== Correspondence ===
The two brothers maintained an intensive correspondence, with Theo often encouraging his depressed brother. Theo was one of the few people Vincent could talk to and confide in. These letters are one of the few sources of information about Vincent's life, providing detailed accounts of not only the occurrences, but also the thoughts and feelings in his life. Over three-quarters of the more than 800 letters Vincent wrote were to Theo, including his first and his last.

It is largely thanks to Theo and his wife Johanna, who in 1914 decided to publish the letters between Theo and Vincent that the letters are available. Hardly any of Theo's letters survive because Vincent failed to keep them. The two-year period in which Vincent and Theo lived together in the neighbourhood of Montmartre in Paris is also the least documented period of Vincent's artistic career because of the lack of letters. These letters witness both the emotional and professional state of Vincent throughout his life as early as 1874 and serve as a diary for his everyday encounters. The letters have been collected and published in the book The Letters of Vincent van Gogh.

=== Film legacy ===
The Van Gogh brothers' relationship figured in the Vincente Minnelli 1956 movie adaptation of Irving Stone's 1934 biographical novel Lust for Life. In it, Hollywood star Kirk Douglas played Vincent, and British actor James Donald played Theo. The family relationship was a central subject in Robert Altman's movie Vincent & Theo (1990), starring British actors Tim Roth as Vincent and Paul Rhys as Theo. The brothers' relationship is also featured in Maurice Pialat's 1991 film Van Gogh, with Jacques Dutronc playing Vincent and Bernard Le Coq as Theo.

The delivery of Vincent's final letter to Theo after Vincent's death, and the circumstances surrounding his death, was the subject of the 2017 film Loving Vincent, which was animated by oil paintings made with Van Gogh's techniques.

Julian Schnabel's meditation on Vincent's artistic life, At Eternity's Gate (2018), featured Willem Dafoe as Vincent and Rupert Friend as Theo.

== Death ==
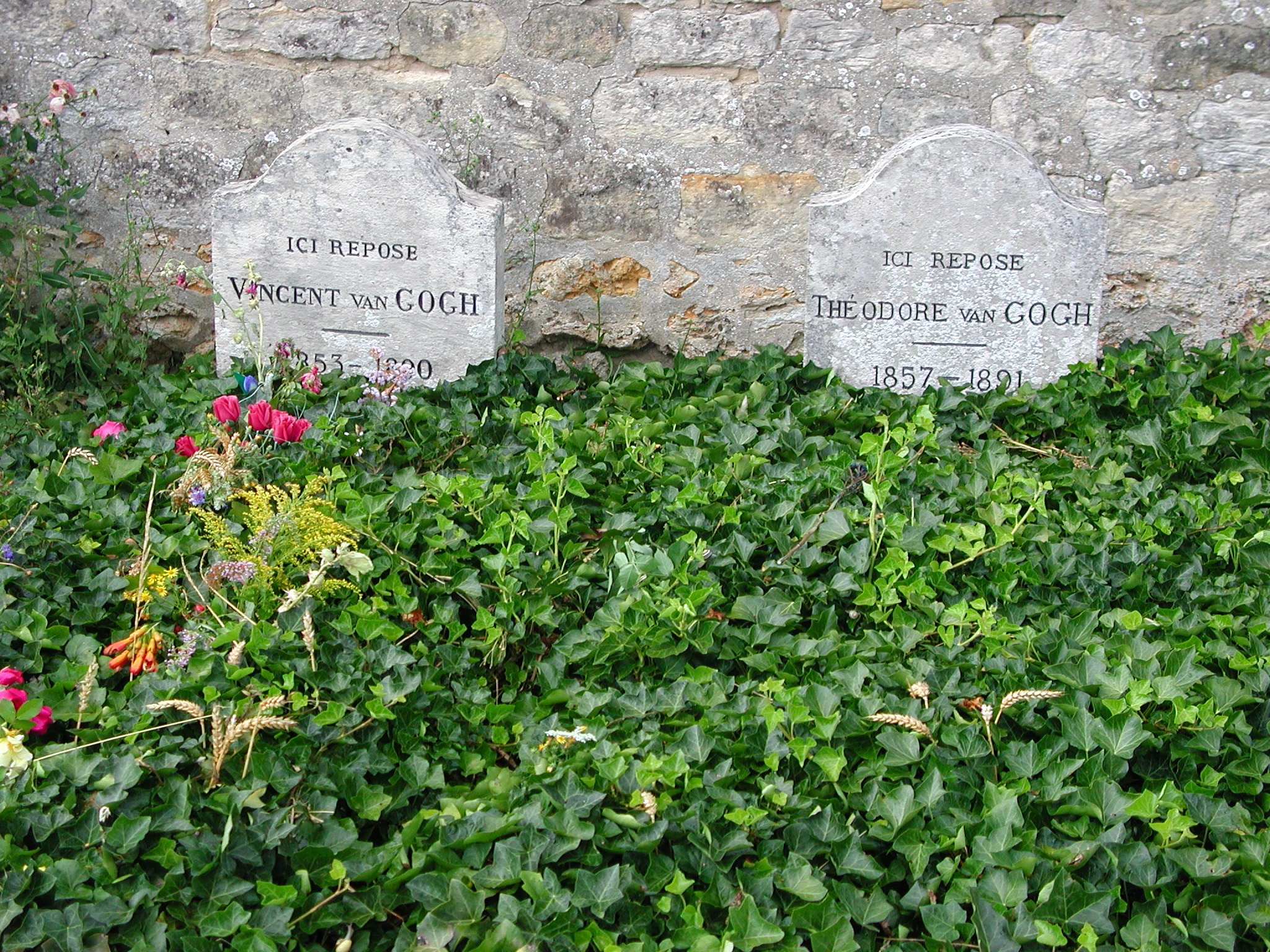
Vincent and Theo van Gogh's graves at the cemetery of Auvers-sur-Oise

Van Gogh's health was not robust when he married. In fact, he had been denied a life insurance policy because of it. It deteriorated significantly in the months after the death of his brother. He was admitted to the Willem Arntz Hospital, a psychiatric hospital, in Den Dolder on 18 November 1890. He had been diagnosed in Paris as suffering from a progressive and general paralysis. Initial examination confirmed this diagnosis. By 1 December his medical notes confirmed he presented all the symptoms of dementia paralytica, a disease of the brain caused by syphilis. He died on 25 January 1891. The cause of death was listed as dementia paralytica caused by "heredity, chronic disease, overwork, sadness".

In 1914, Theo's body was exhumed from his resting place in Utrecht, Netherlands, and reburied with his brother at Auvers-sur-Oise at the wish of his widow, Jo, so the brothers could "lie together eternally". By doing that, she also guaranteed that those visiting the grave of the—by then—well-known artist, would be aware of Theo's closeness to his older brother in life.

== See also ==
- Van Gogh's family in his art
- Johanna van Gogh-Bonger
- List of works by Vincent van Gogh, largely financed by Theo van Gogh
