= Horse racing =

Equestrian sport

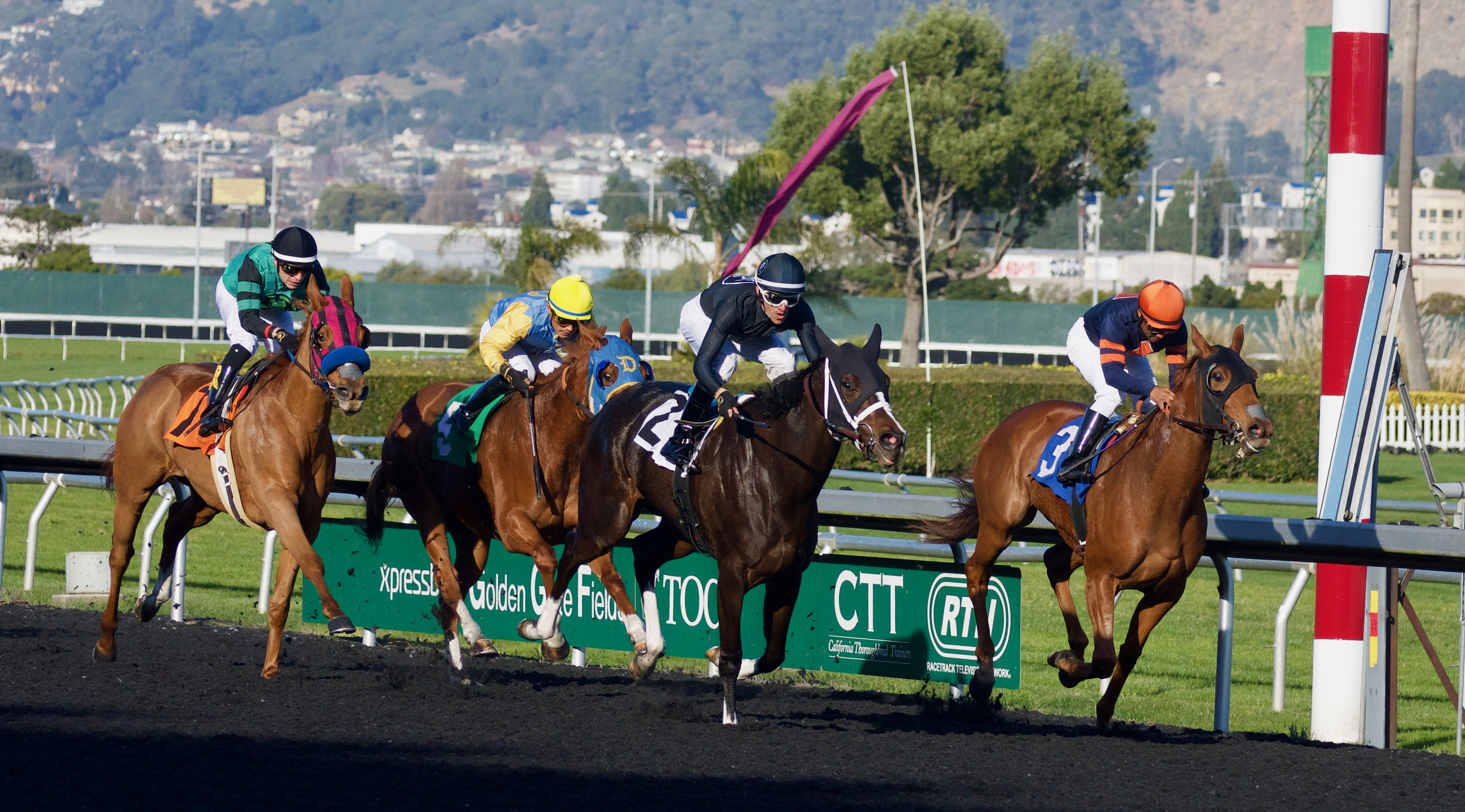
- Horse racing at Golden Gate Fields, 2017
- Highest governing body: Generally regulated by assorted national or regional governing bodies, International Federation of Horseracing Authorities

Characteristics
- Contact: Yes
- Mixed-sex: Yes
- Type: Outdoor
- Equipment: Horse, appropriate horse tack
- Venue: Turf, dirt or synthetic surface race track suitable for horses

Presence
- Country or region: Worldwide
- Olympic: No

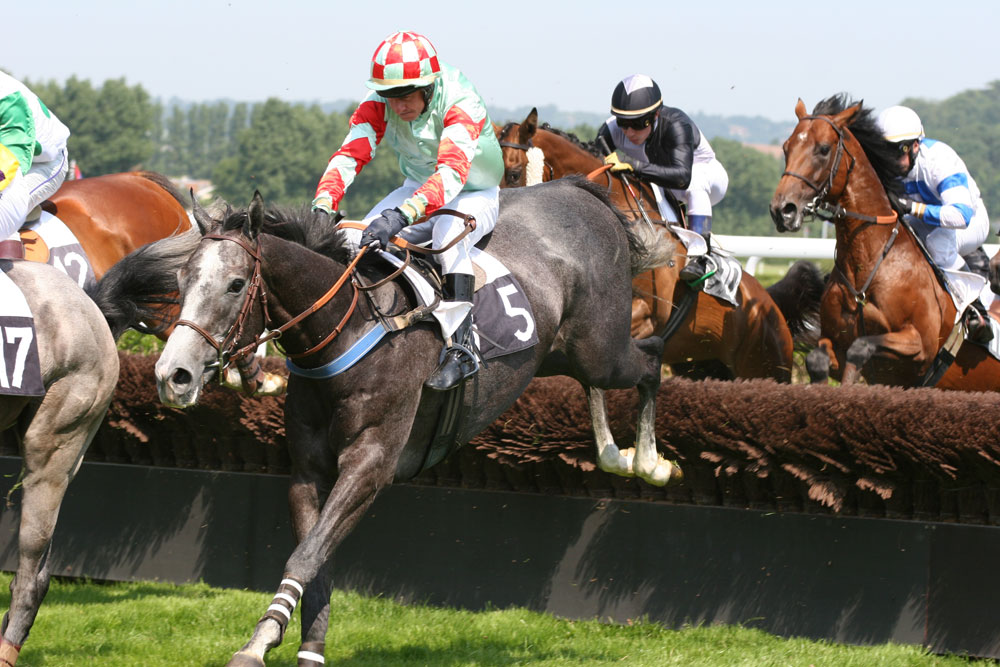
Steeplechase racing at Deauville

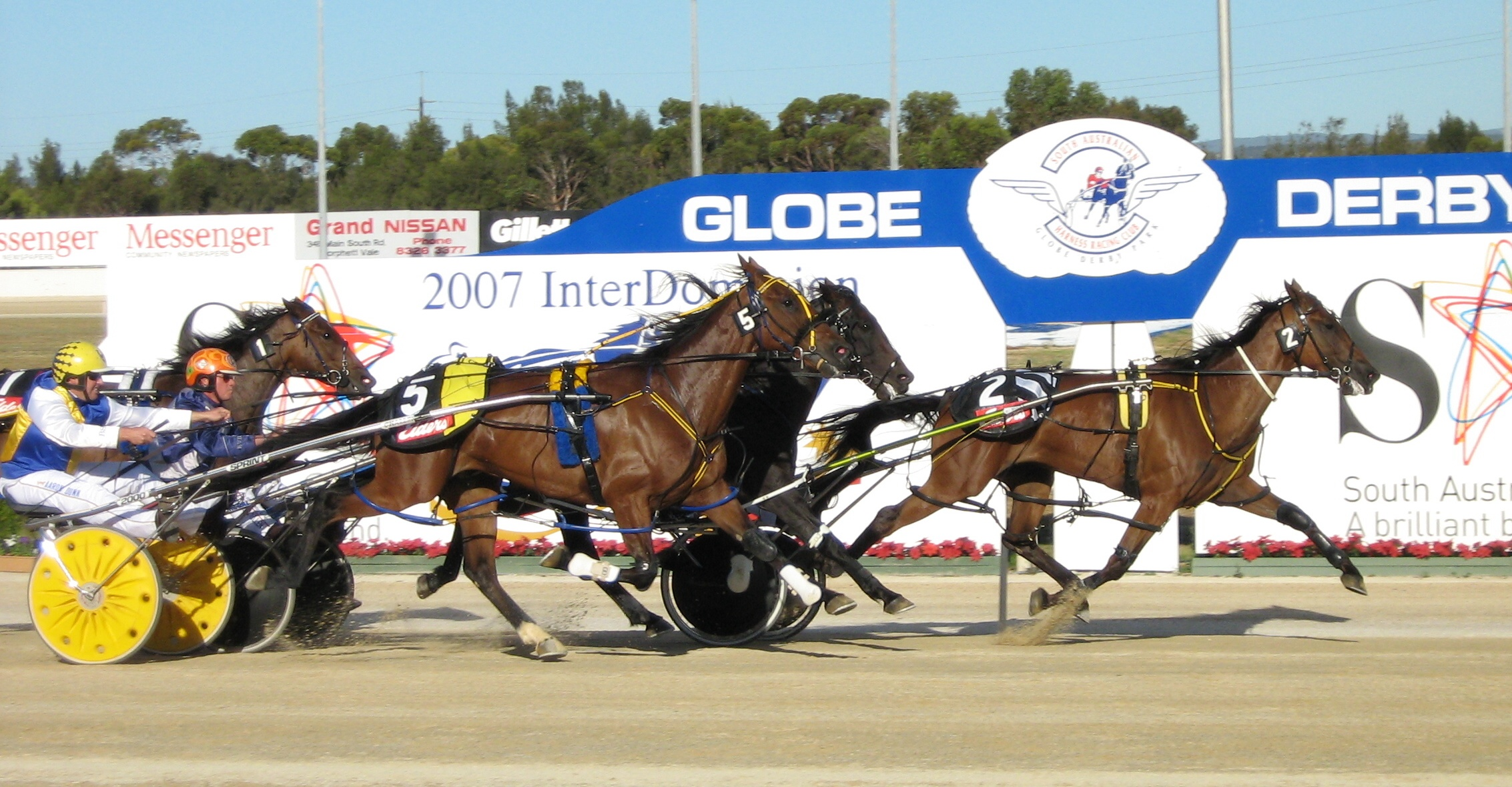
Harness racing in Adelaide

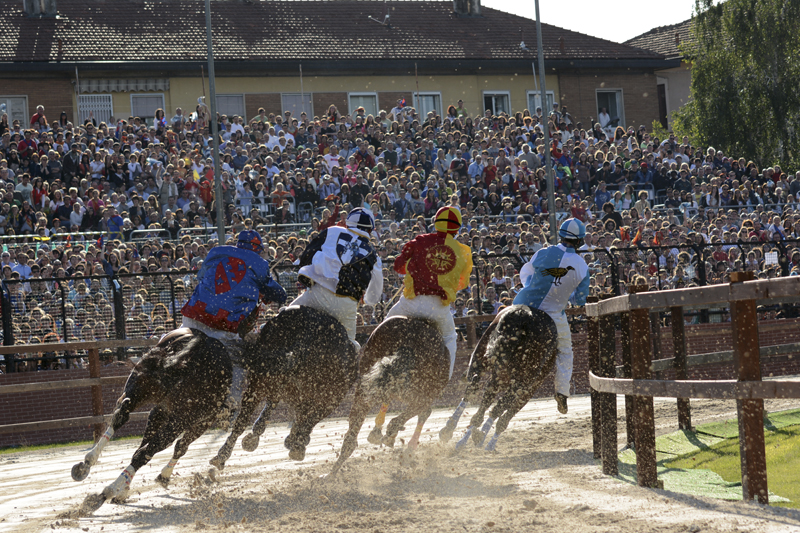
Traditional bareback horse racing in the Palio di Legnano 2013

Horse racing is an equestrian performance activity, typically involving two or more horses ridden by jockeys (or sometimes driven without riders) over a set distance for competition. It is one of the most ancient of all sports, as its basic premise – to identify which of two or more horses is the fastest over a set course or distance – has been mostly unchanged since at least classical antiquity.

Horse races vary widely in format, and many countries have developed their own particular traditions around the sport. Variations include restricting races to particular breeds, running over obstacles, running over different distances, running on different track surfaces, and running in different gaits. In some races, horses are assigned different weights to carry to reflect differences in ability, a process known as handicapping.

== Gambling ==
While horses are sometimes raced purely for sport, a major part of horse racing's interest and economic importance is in the gambling associated with it, an activity that in 2019 generated a worldwide market worth around US$115 billion.

== World Championship ==
The International Federation of Horseracing Authorities was founded in 1961 with the task of standardizing international Thoroughbred horse racing practices, but no official world championship exists.

== History ==
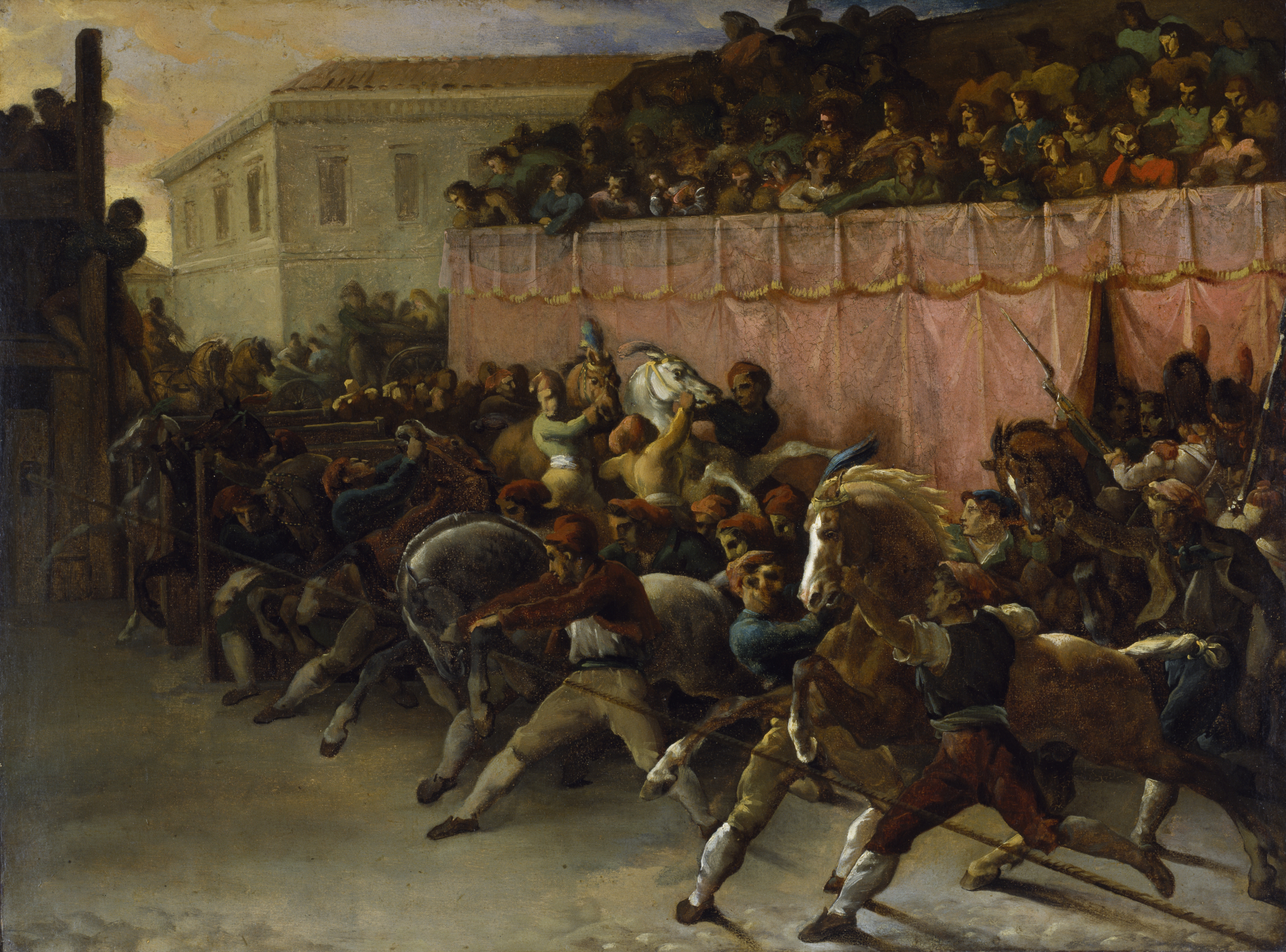
Riderless Racers at Rome by Théodore Géricault, 1817

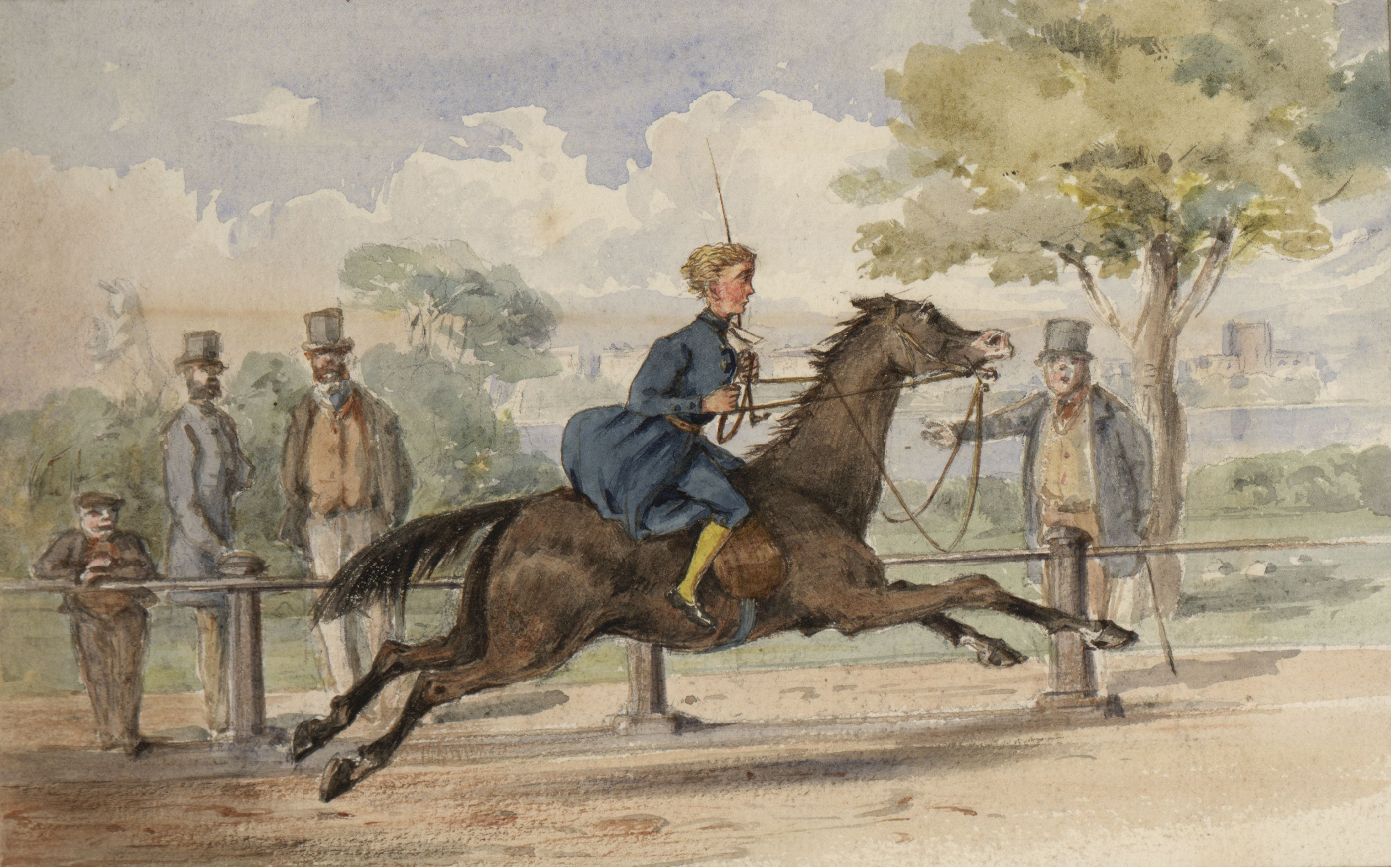
British nobility horse racing at Apsley House, London c. 1850s

Horse racing has a long and distinguished history and has been practiced in civilizations across the world since ancient times. Archaeological records indicate that horse racing occurred in Ancient Greece, Ancient Rome, Babylon, Syria, Arabia, and Egypt. It also plays an important part of myth and legend, such as in the contest between the steeds of the god Odin and the giant Hrungnir in Norse mythology.

Chariot racing was one of the most popular sports of ancient Greece, Rome and the Byzantine Empire. By 648 BCE, both chariot and mounted horse racing events were part of the ancient Greek Olympics, and were important in the other Panhellenic Games. Chariot racing was dangerous to both driver and horse, often leading to serious injury and even death. In the Roman Empire, chariot and mounted horse racing were major industries. The chariot teams were organized into four different principal factions, each distinguished by a color: red, white, blue, and green. From the mid-fifth century BCE, spring carnival in Rome closed with a horse race. Fifteen to twenty riderless horses, originally imported from the Barbary Coast of North Africa, were set loose to run the length of the Via del Corso, a long, straight city street. The race lasted about two-and-a-half minutes.

In later times, Thoroughbred racing became popular with British royalty and aristocrats, earning it the title of "Sport of Kings".

Historically, equestrians honed their skills through games and races. Equestrian sports provided entertainment for crowds and displayed the horsemanship required for battle. Horse racing evolved from impromptu competitions among riders and drivers. The various forms of competition, which required demanding and specialized skills from both horse and rider, resulted in the systematic development of specialized breeds and equipment. The popularity of equestrian sports throughout the centuries has resulted in the preservation of skills that would otherwise have vanished once horses were no longer used in combat.

In Britain, horse racing became well-established in the 18th century, and continued to grow in popularity. King Charles II (reigned 1660 to 1685) was an avid sportsman who gave Newmarket its prominence. By 1750, the Jockey Club was formed as a way to control the Newmarket races, set the rules of the game, prevent dishonesty, and create a level field. The Epsom Derby began in 1780. The first of the five classic races began with the St Leger Stakes in 1776. In 1814, the system was complete with five annual races. While Newmarket and the Jockey Club set the standards, most of the racing took place in landowners' fields and in rising towns for small cash prizes and enormous local prestige. The system of wagering was essential to funding and growing of the industry, and all classes, from paupers to royalty participated. Members of high society were in control, and they made a special effort to keep out the riff-raff and to keep the criminal element away from the wagering. With real money at stake, the system needed skilled jockeys, trainers, grooms, and experts at breeding, which opened up new careers for working-class rural men. Every young ambitious stable boy could dream of making it big.

In addition to its rich history, horse racing is marked by noteworthy statistics. The Thoroughbred Secretariat still holds the fastest times in all three Triple Crown races from his 1973 wins, being dubbed “Big Red” following his career. North American Jockey Russell Baze has an unmatched 12,842 victories. Economic significance is reflected in the career earnings of Romantic Warrior, totaling over $27 million.

Horse racing has also seen technological advancements, with innovations like photo finishes, electronic timing, and advanced breeding selection techniques enhancing the sport's precision and competitiveness.

Horse racing was one of the few sports that continued during the 2020 COVID-19 crisis, with the Australian and Hong Kong racing jurisdictions carrying on, albeit with no crowds. The United States, the United Kingdom, and France were some of the more prominent racing bodies to either postpone or cancel all events.

== Types of horse racing ==
There are many types of horse racing, including:

- Flat racing, where horses gallop directly between two points around a straight or oval track.
- Jump racing, or Jumps racing, also known as Steeplechasing or, in Great Britain and Ireland, National Hunt racing, where horses race over obstacles.
- Harness racing, where horses trot or pace while pulling a driver in a sulky.
- Saddle Trotting, where horses must trot from a starting point to a finishing point under saddle
- Endurance racing, where horses travel across the country over extreme distances, generally ranging from 25 to 100 miles (40 to 161 km). Anything less than 25 miles qualifies as a limited distance ride or LD.

Different breeds of horses have been bred to excel in each of these disciplines. Breeds that are used for flat racing include the Thoroughbred, Quarter Horse, Arabian, Paint, and Appaloosa. Jump racing breeds include the Thoroughbred and AQPS. In harness racing, Standardbreds are used in Australia, New Zealand and North America. In Europe, Russian and French Trotters are used with Standardbreds. Light cold blood horses, such as Finnhorses and Scandinavian Coldblood Trotters are also used in harness racing within their respective geographical areas.

There are also races for ponies: both flat and jump and harness racing.

=== Flat racing ===
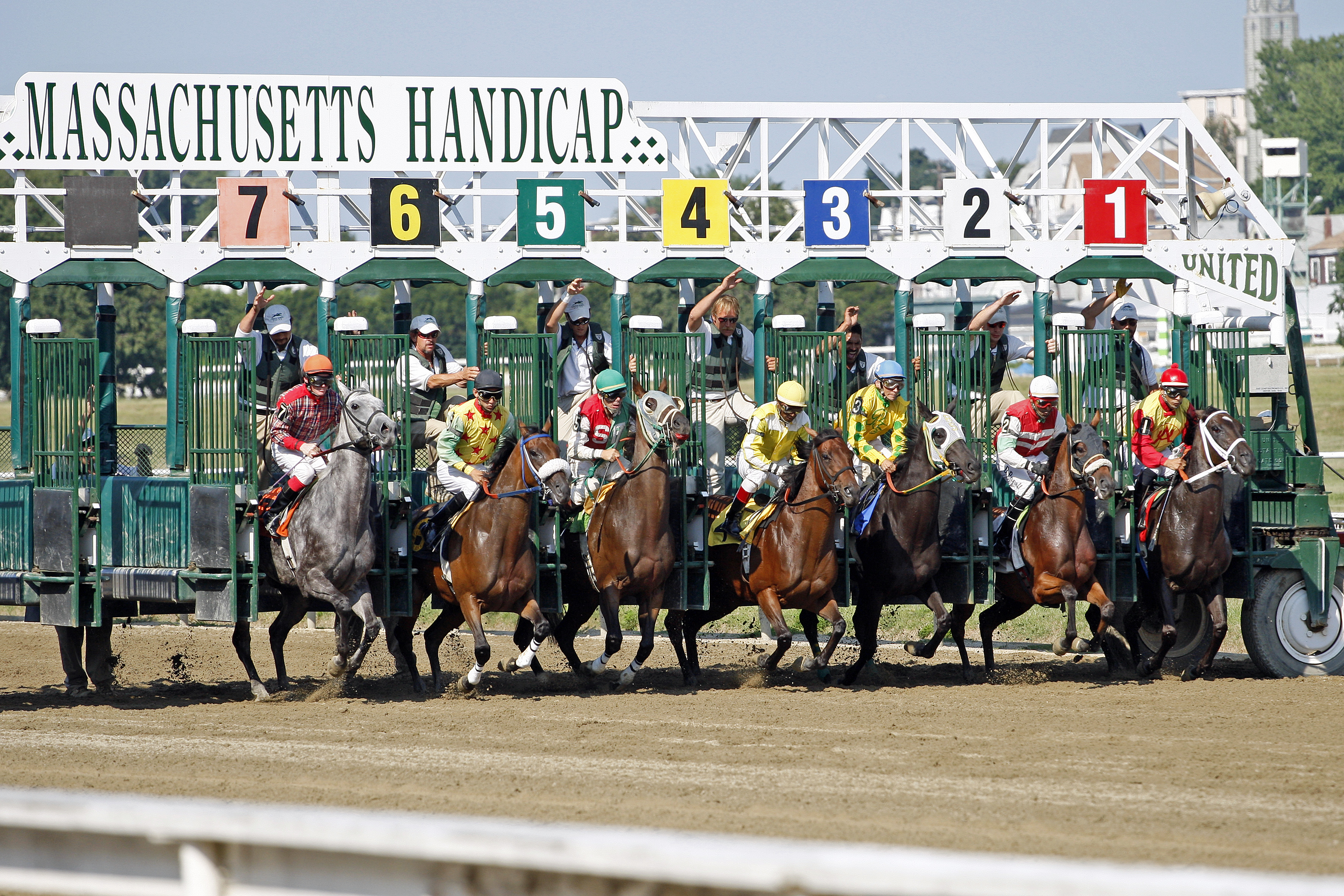
Suffolk Downs starting gate, East Boston, Massachusetts

Flat racing is the most common form of horse racing seen worldwide. Flat racing tracks are typically oval in shape and are generally level, although in Great Britain and Ireland there is much greater variation, including figure-of-eight tracks like Windsor and tracks with often severe gradients and changes of camber, such as Epsom Racecourse. Track surfaces vary, with turf most common in Europe and dirt more common in North America and Asia. Newly designed synthetic surfaces, such as Polytrack or Tapeta, are seen at some tracks.

Individual flat races are run over distances ranging from 440 yards (400 m) to more than four miles (6.4 km), although races longer than two miles (3.2 km) are quite rare, and distances between five and twelve furlongs (1.0 and 2.4 km) are the most common. Short races are generally referred to as "sprints", while longer races are known as "routes" in the United States or "staying races" in Europe. Although fast acceleration ("a turn of foot") is usually required to win either type of race, sprints are generally seen as a test of speed, while long-distance races are seen as a test of stamina. The most prestigious flat races in the world, such as the Prix de l'Arc de Triomphe, Melbourne Cup, Japan Cup, Epsom Derby, Kentucky Derby and Dubai World Cup, are run over distances in the middle of this range and are seen as tests of both speed and stamina to some extent.

In the most prestigious races, horses are generally allocated the same weight to carry for fairness, with allowances given to younger horses and female horses running against males. These races are called conditions races and offer the biggest purses. There is another category of races called handicap races where each horse is assigned a different weight to carry based on its ability. Besides the weight they carry, horses' performance can also be influenced by position relative to the inside barrier, sex, jockey, and training.

=== Jump racing ===
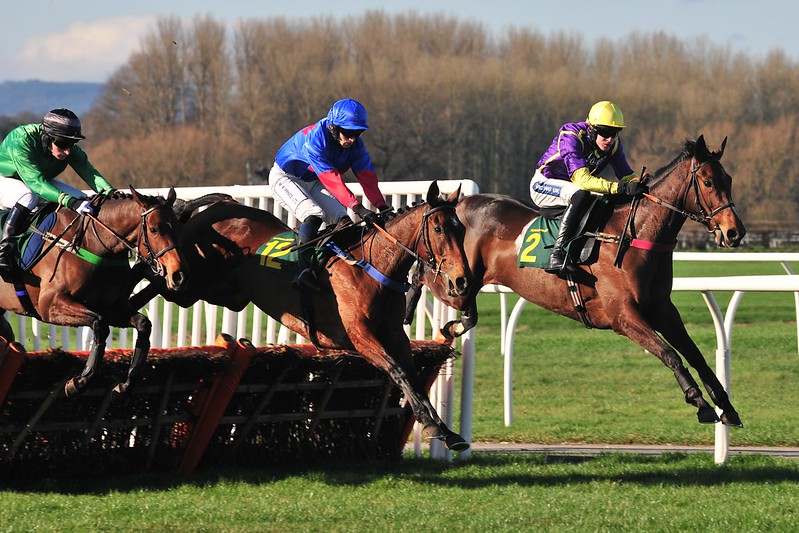
Race horses hurdling at Bangor

Jump (or jumps) racing in Great Britain and Ireland is known as National Hunt racing (although, confusingly, National Hunt racing also includes flat races taking place at jumps meetings; these are known as National Hunt flat races). Jump racing can be subdivided into steeplechasing and hurdling, according to the type and size of obstacles being jumped. The word "steeplechasing" can also refer collectively to any type of jump race in certain racing jurisdictions, particularly in the United States.

Typically, horses progress to bigger obstacles and longer distances as they get older, so that a European jumps horse will tend to start in National Hunt flat races as a juvenile, move on to hurdling after a year or so, and then, if thought capable, move on to steeplechasing.

=== Harness racing ===
A type of racing where horses go around a track while pulling a sulky and a driver behind them. In this sport, Standardbreds are used. These horses are separated into two categories, trotters and pacers. Pacers move the legs on each side of their body in tandem, while trotters move their diagonal legs together. Pacers are typically faster than trotters. Occasionally a horse will break their gait into a canter or gallop, requiring the driver to pull back and slow the horse, which might lose position or even cause disqualification. Notable races include the Hambletonian and the Breeder's Crown series.

=== Saddle trot racing ===
Ridden trot races are more common in places such as Europe and New Zealand. These horses are trotters who race on the flat under saddle with a jockey on their backs.

=== Endurance racing ===
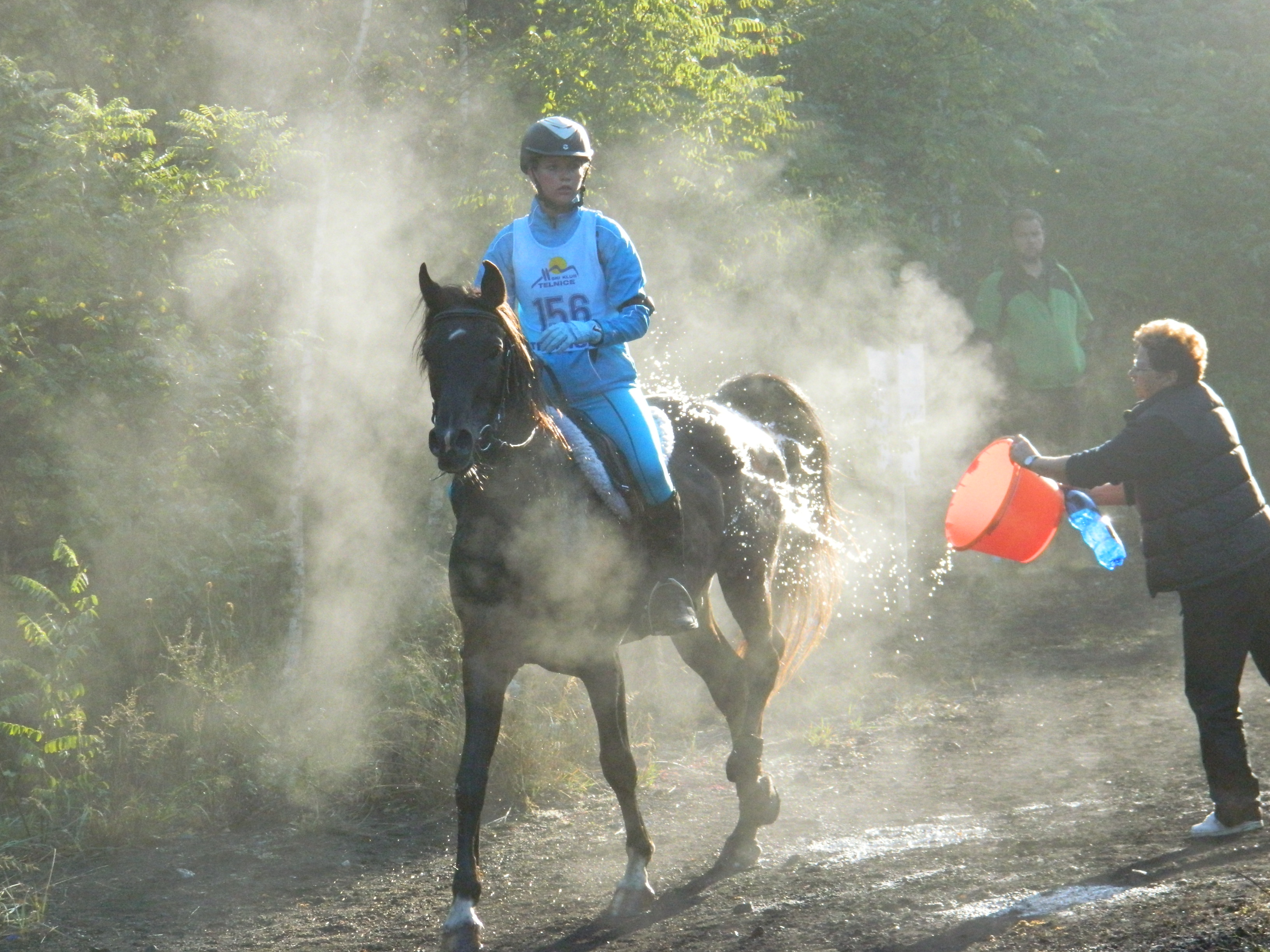
Cooling an endurance horse

The length of an endurance race varies greatly. Some are relatively short, at ten miles, while other races can be up to one hundred miles. There are a few races that are even longer than one hundred miles and last multiple days. These different lengths of races are divided into five categories: pleasure rides (10–20 miles), non-competitive trail rides (21–27 miles), competitive trail rides (20–45 miles), progressive trail rides (25–60 miles), and endurance rides (40–100 miles in one day, up to 250 miles (400 km) in multiple days). Because each race is very long, trails of natural terrain are generally used.

Contemporary organized endurance racing began in California around 1955, and the first race marked the beginning of the Tevis Cup. This race was a one-hundred-mile, one-day-long ride starting in Squaw Valley, Placer County, and ending in Auburn. Founded in 1972, the American Endurance Ride Conference was the United States' first national endurance riding association. The longest endurance race in the world is the Mongol Derby, which is 1,000 km (620 mi) long.

== Breeds ==
In most horse races, entry is restricted to certain breeds; that is, the horse must have a sire (father) and a dam (mother) who are studbook-approved individuals of whatever breed is racing. For example, in a normal harness race, the horse's sire and dam must both be pure Standardbreds. The exception to this is in Quarter Horse racing, where an Appendix Quarter Horse may be considered eligible to race against (standard) Quarter Horses. The designation of "Appendix" refers to the addendum section, or Appendix, of the Official Quarter Horse registry. An Appendix Quarter Horse is a horse that has either one Quarter Horse parent and one parent of any other eligible breed (such as Thoroughbred, the most common Appendix cross), two parents that are registered Appendix Quarter Horses, or one parent that is a Quarter Horse and one parent that is an Appendix Quarter Horse. AQHA also issues a "Racing Register of Merit", which allows a horse to race on Quarter Horse tracks, but not be considered a Quarter Horse for breeding purposes (unless other requirements are met).

A stallion with a good pedigree who has won many races may be put to stud when he is retired, and fillies and mares of merit may become broodmares. While artificial insemination, intracytoplasmic sperm injection, embryo transfer and other advanced reproductive technologies, along with DNA identification have expanded options for horses of most breeds, Thoroughbred registry requires live cover breeding.

Pedigrees of stallions are recorded in various books and websites, such as Weatherbys Stallion Book, the Australian Stud Book and Thoroughbred Heritage.

=== Thoroughbred ===
There are three founding sires that all Thoroughbreds can trace back to: the Darley Arabian, the Godolphin Arabian, and the Byerley Turk, named after their respective owners Thomas Darley, Lord Godolphin, and Captain Robert Byerley. They were taken to England, where they were bred with mares from English and imported bloodlines. The resultant foals were the first generation of thoroughbreds, and all modern thoroughbreds are their descents. Thoroughbreds range in height from as small as 15 hands (a hand being four inches) to over 17 hands. Thoroughbreds can travel medium distances at fast paces, requiring a balance between speed and endurance. Thoroughbreds may be bay, black, dark bay/brown, chestnut, gray, roan, white or palomino. Artificial insemination, cloning and embryo transfer are not allowed in the Thoroughbred breed.

=== Standardbred ===
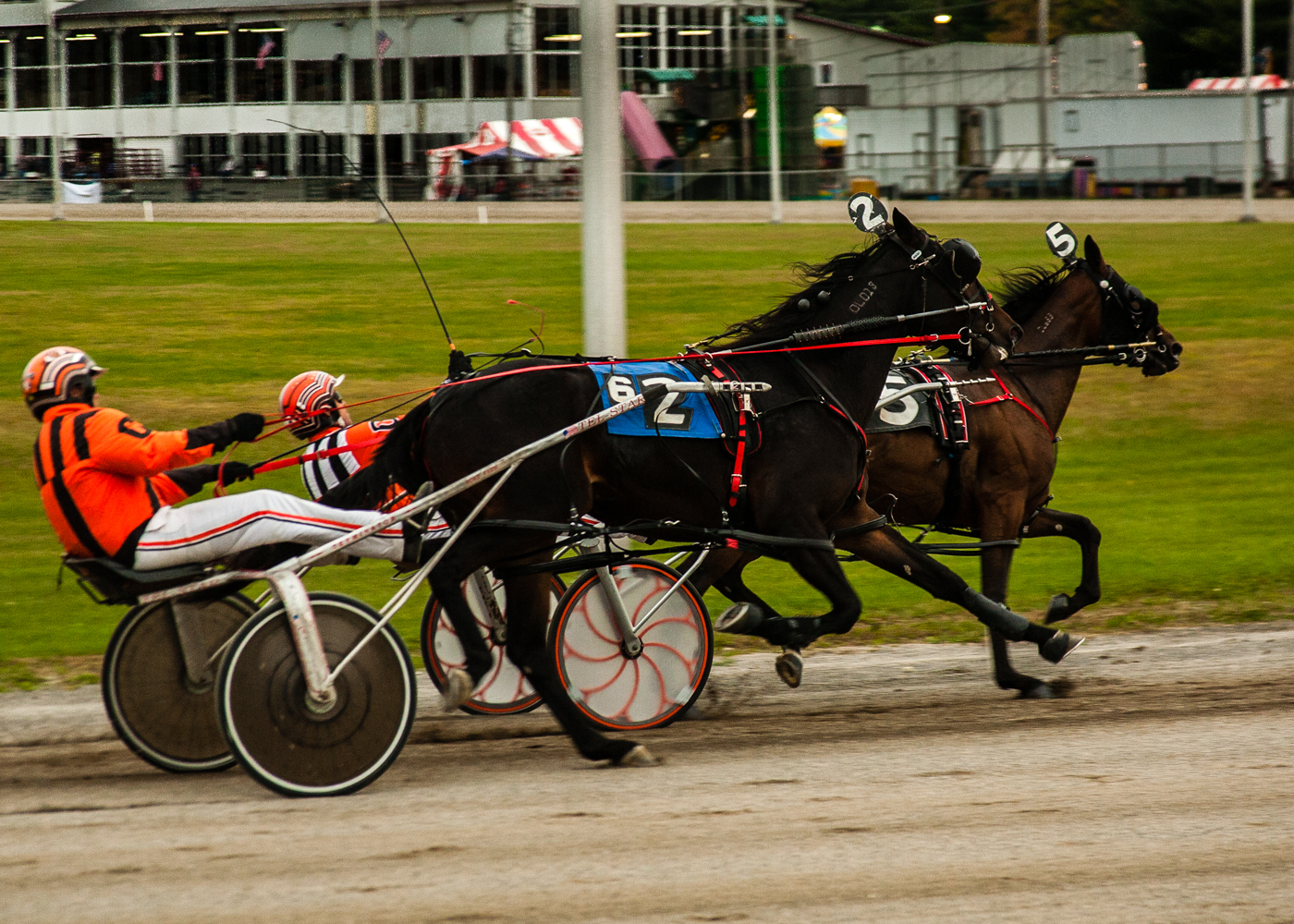
Standardbred horses harness racing

The standardbred is a breed of horse used for a variety of purposes, but they are largely bred for harness racing. They are descended from Thoroughbreds, Morgans, and extinct breeds. Standardbreds are typically docile and easy to handle. They do not spook easily and are quite versatile in what they can do, with an active post-racing career program by the United States Trotting Association.

=== Arabian horse ===
The Arabian horse was developed by the Bedouin people of West Asia specifically for stamina over long distances, so they could outrun their enemies. It was not until 1725 that the first Arabian horses were brought to North America, and not until about the time of the Civil War that they were bred as purebreds. Until the formation in 1908 of the Arabian Horse Club of America (becoming the Arabian Horse Registry of America in 1969), Arabians were recorded with the Jockey Club in a separate subsection from Thoroughbreds.

Arabians must be able to withstand traveling long distances at a moderate pace. They have an abundance of slow twitch (type I muscle fibers), enabling their muscles to work for extended periods of time. This is in contrast to the larger fast twitch (type II) muscle fibers that predominate in the Quarter Horse, which allow for short bursts of explosive speed but poor endurance. The Arabian is primarily used today in endurance racing but is also raced over traditional race tracks in many countries.

Arabian Horse Racing is governed by the International Federation of Arabian Horse Racing.

=== Quarter Horse ===
The ancestors of the Quarter Horse were prevalent in America in the early 17th century. These horses were a blend of Colonial Spanish horses crossed with English horses that were brought over in the 1700s. The native horse and the English horse were bred together, resulting in a compact, muscular horse. At this time, they were mainly used for chores such as plowing and cattle work. The American Quarter Horse was not recognized as an official breed until the formation of the American Quarter Horse Association in 1940.

In order to be successful in racing, Quarter Horses need to be able to propel themselves forward at extremely fast sprinter speed. The Quarter Horse has much larger hind limb muscles than the Arabian, which make it less suitable for endurance racing. It also has more type II-b muscle fibers, which allow the Quarter Horse to accelerate rapidly.

When Quarter Horse racing began, it was very expensive to lay a full mile of track so it was agreed that a straight track of four hundred meters, or one-quarter of a mile, would be laid instead. It became the standard racing distance for Quarter Horses and inspired their name. With the exception of the longer, 870-yard (800 m) distance contests, Quarter Horse races are run flat out, with the horses running at top speed for the duration. There is less jockeying for position, as turns are rare, and many races end with several contestants grouped together at the wire. The track surface is similar to that of Thoroughbred racing and usually consists of dirt.

In addition to the three main racing breeds above and their crosses, horse racing may be conducted using various other breeds: Appaloosa, American Paint Horse, Selle Français, AQPS and Korean Jeju.

=== Horse breeds and muscle structure ===
Muscles are bundles of contractile fibers that are attached to bones by tendons. These bundles have different types of fibers within them, and horses have adapted over the years to produce different amounts of these fibers.

- Type I muscle fibers are adapted for aerobic exercise and rely on the presence of oxygen. They are slow-twitch fibers. They allow muscles to work for longer periods of time resulting in greater endurance.
- Type II muscles are adapted for anaerobic exercise because they can function in the absence of oxygen.
- Type II-a fibers are intermediate, representing a balance between the fast-twitch fibers and the slow-twitch fibers. They allow the muscles to generate both speed and endurance. Thoroughbreds possess more Type II-a muscle fibers than Quarter Horses or Arabians. This type of fiber allows them to propel themselves forward at great speeds and maintain it for an extended distance.
- Type II-b fibers are fast-twitch fibers. These fibers allow muscles to contract quickly, resulting in a great deal of power and speed.

== Training ==
The conditioning program for the horses varies depending on the race length. Genetics, training, age, and skeletal soundness are all factors that contribute to a horse's performance. The muscle structure and fiber type of horses depends on the breed; therefore, genetics must be considered when constructing a conditioning plan. A horse's fitness plan must be coordinated properly in order to prevent injury or lameness. If these are to occur, they may negatively affect a horse's willingness to learn. Sprinting exercises are appropriate for training two-year-old racehorses, but the number is limited by psychological factors as well as physical. A horse's skeletal system adapts to the exercise it receives. Because the skeletal system does not reach full maturity until the horse is at least six years of age, young racehorses often suffer injuries.

== Horse racing by continent ==
=== North America ===
==== United States ====
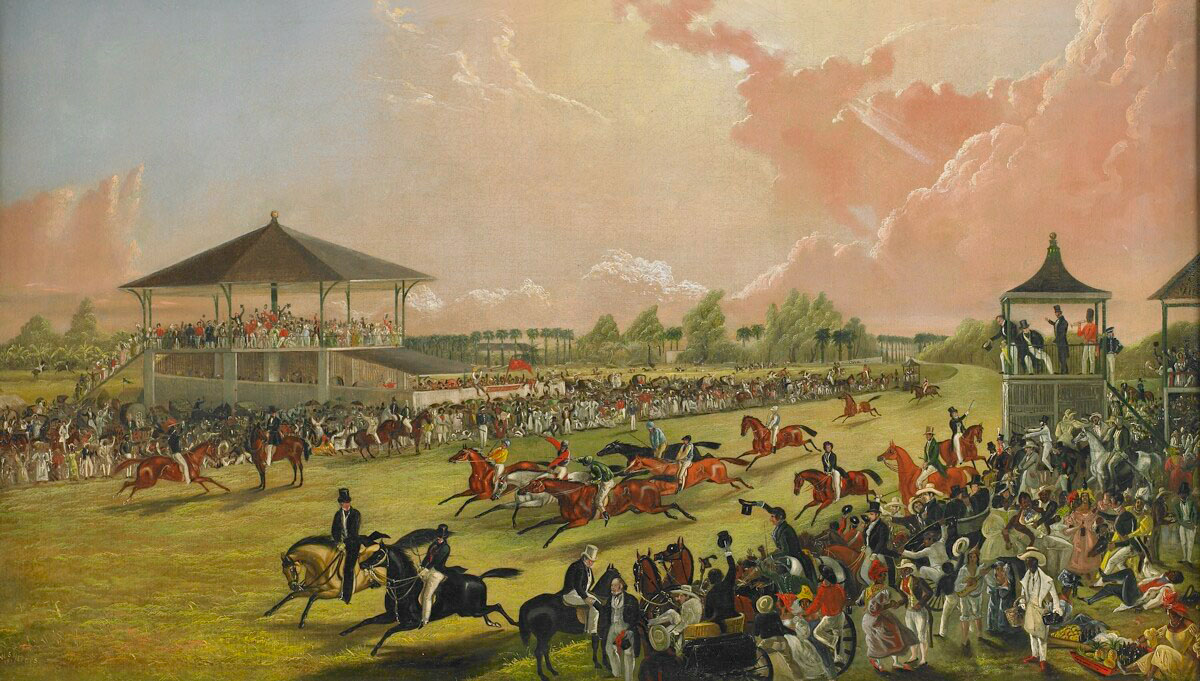
Horse racing at Jacksonville, Alabama, 1841

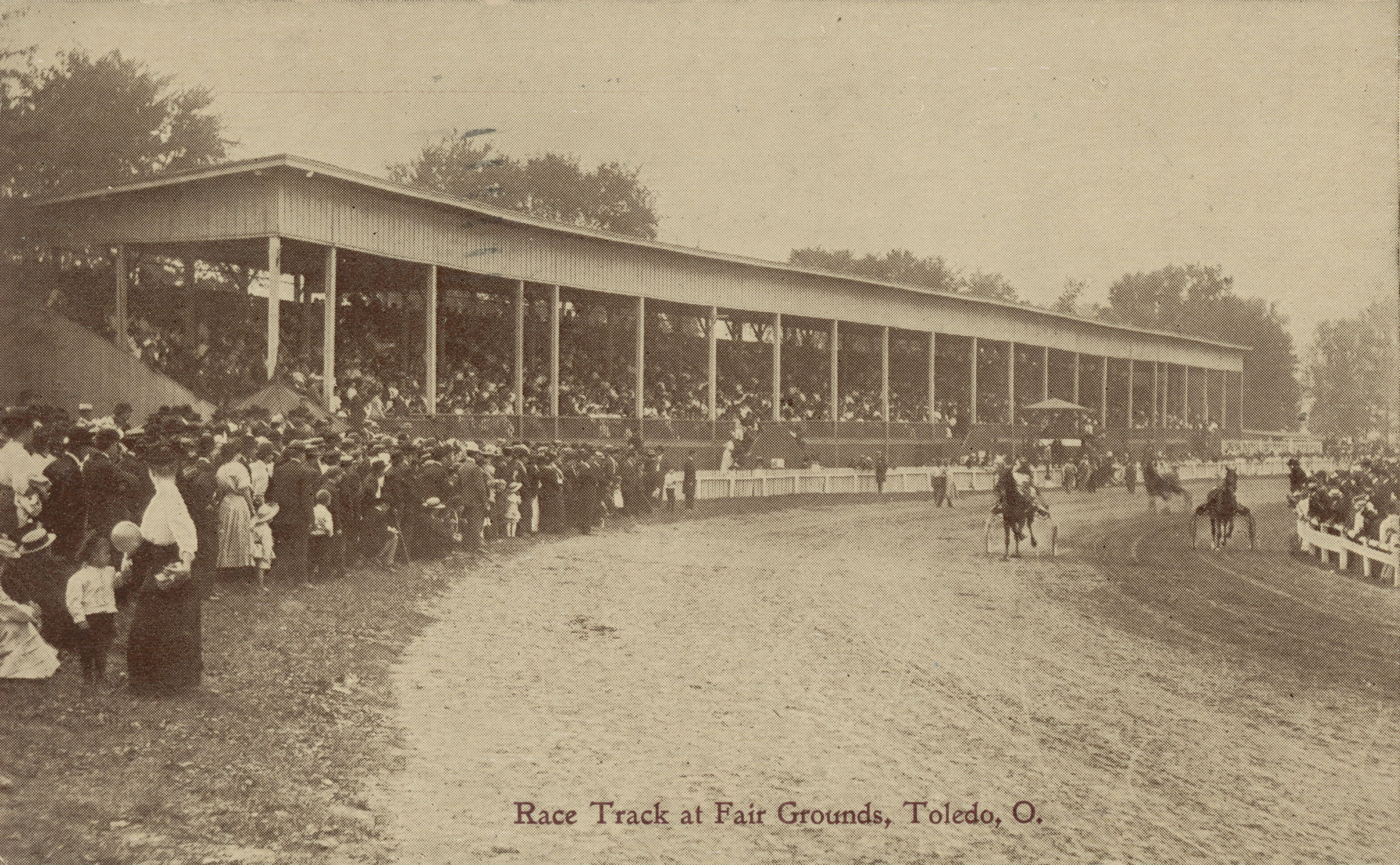
Horse racing at Toledo, Ohio, 1910

In the United States, Thoroughbred flat races are run on surfaces of either dirt, synthetic or turf. Other tracks offer Quarter Horse racing and Standardbred racing, on combinations of these three types of racing surfaces. Racing of other breeds, such as Arabian horse racing, is found on a limited basis. American Thoroughbred races are run at a wide variety of distances, most commonly from 5 to 12 furlongs (0.63 to 1.50 mi; 1.0 to 2.4 km); with this in mind, breeders of Thoroughbred race horses attempt to breed horses that excel at a particular distance (see dosage index).

Horse racing in the United States and on the North American continent dates back to 1665, which saw the establishment of the Newmarket Course in Salisbury, New York, a section of what is now known as the Hempstead Plains of Long Island, New York. This first racing meet in North America was supervised by New York's colonial governor, Richard Nicolls. The area is now occupied by the present Nassau County, New York, a region of Greater Westbury and East Garden City. The South Westbury section is still known as Salisbury.

The first record of quarter-mile length races dated back to 1674 in Henrico County, Virginia. Each race consisted of only two horses, and they raced down the village streets and lanes. The Quarter Horse received its name from the length of the race.

Tracing back the history of horse racing in the United States to its earliest inception in 1665, this sport has become an industry contributing approximately $15 billion to the U.S. economy in 2019. Horse racing has become the second most popular spectator sport in the United States with the establishment of historic tracks like Belmont Park, major events like the Kentucky Derby, and significant institutions such as the American Stud Book.

The American Stud Book was started in 1868, prompting the beginning of organized horse racing in the United States. There were 314 tracks operating in the United States by 1890; and in 1894, the American Jockey Club was formed.

The Pleasanton Fairgrounds Racetrack at the Alameda County Fairgrounds in California is the oldest remaining horse racing track in America, dating from 1858, when it was founded by the sons of the Spaniard Don Agustín Bernal.

Belmont Park is located at the western edge of the Hempstead Plains in New York. Its mile-and-a-half main track is the largest dirt Thoroughbred racecourse in the world, and it has the sport's largest grandstand.

One of the latest major horse tracks opened in the United States was the Meadowlands Racetrack in New Jersey, opening in 1977 for Thoroughbred and Harness racing. It is the home of the Meadowlands Cup. Other more recently opened tracks include Remington Park, Oklahoma City, opened in 1988, Sam Houston Race Park in the Houston metro area, opened in 1994, and Lone Star Park in the Dallas–Fort Worth Metroplex, opened in 1997; the latter track hosted the prestigious Breeders' Cup series of races in 2004.

Thoroughbred horse racing in the United States has its own Hall of Fame in Saratoga Springs, New York. The Hall of Fame honors remarkable horses, jockeys, owners, and trainers.

The traditional high point of US horse racing is the Kentucky Derby, held on the first Saturday of May at Churchill Downs in Louisville, Kentucky. This race is known to be the "Most Exciting Two Minutes Sports" attracting the largest television audience of any American horse race. The Kentucky Derby, along with the Preakness Stakes (held two weeks later at Pimlico Race Course in Baltimore, Maryland) and the Belmont Stakes (held three weeks after the Preakness at Belmont Park on Long Island), form the Triple Crown of Thoroughbred Racing for three-year-olds. They are all held through May and the beginning of June. In recent years the Breeders' Cup races, run at the end of the year, have challenged the Triple Crown events as determiners of the three-year-old champion. The Breeders' Cup is normally held at a different track every year; however, the 2010 and 2011 editions were both held at Churchill Downs, and 2012, 2013 and 2014 races were held at Santa Anita Park. Keeneland, in Lexington, Kentucky, hosted the 2015 Breeders' Cup.

The corresponding Standardbred event is the Breeders Crown. There is also a Triple Crown of Harness Racing for Pacers and a Triple Crown of Harness Racing for Trotters.

American betting on horse racing is sanctioned and regulated by the state where the race is located. Simulcast betting exists across state lines with minimal oversight except the companies involved through legalized parimutuel gambling. A takeout, or "take", is removed from each betting pool and distributed according to state law, among the state, race track and horsemen. A variety of factors affect takeout, namely location and the type of wager that is placed. One form of parimutuel gaming is Instant Racing, in which players bet on video replays of races.

Advance-deposit wagering (ADW) is a form of gambling on the outcome of horse races in which the bettor must fund his or her account before being allowed to place bets. ADW is often conducted online or by phone. In contrast to ADW, credit shops allow wagers without advance funding; accounts are settled at month-end. Racetrack owners, horse trainers and state governments sometimes receive a cut of ADW revenues.

==== Canada ====
The most famous racehorse from Canada is generally considered to be Northern Dancer, who after winning the Kentucky Derby, Preakness and Queen's Plate in 1964 went on to become the most successful Thoroughbred sire of the twentieth century; his two-minute-flat Derby was the fastest on record until Secretariat in 1973. The only challenger to his title of greatest Canadian horse would be his son Nijinsky II, who is the last horse to win the English Triple Crown. Woodbine Racetrack (1956) in Toronto is home of the King's Plate (1860), Canada's premier Thoroughbred stakes race, and the North America Cup (1984), Canada's premier Standardbred stakes race. It is the only race track in North America which stages Thoroughbred and Standardbred (harness) meetings on the same day. The Canadian International and Woodbine Mile (1981) are Canada's most important Grade I races worth Can$1,000,000 each, and have been won by many renowned horses such as Secretariat and Wise Dan respectively. Other key races include Woodbine Oaks (1956), Prince of Wales Stakes (1929), Breeders' Stakes (1889) and Canadian Derby (1930).

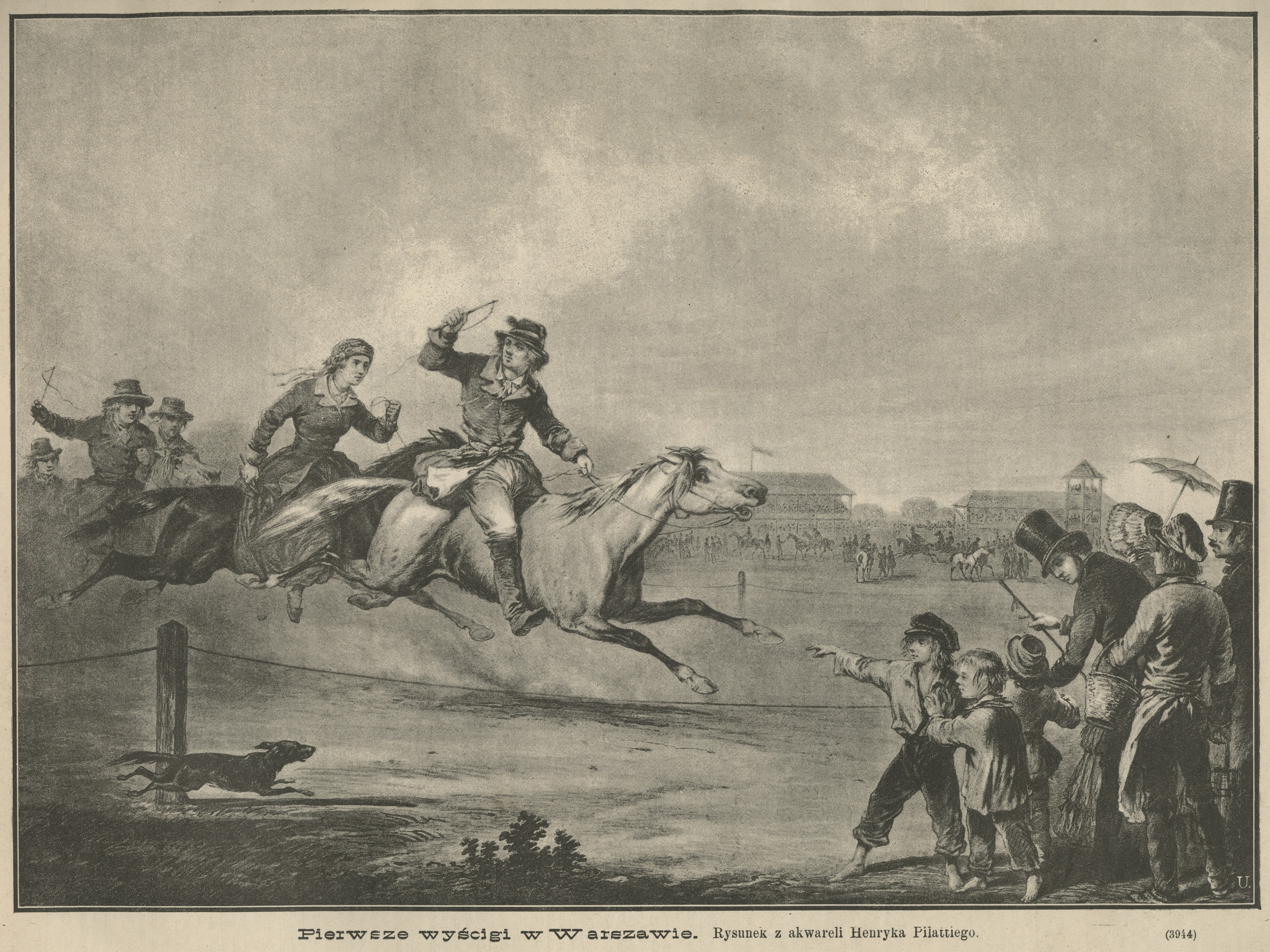
Horse Racing in Warsaw at Pole Mokotowskie Race Track in 1891

=== Europe ===
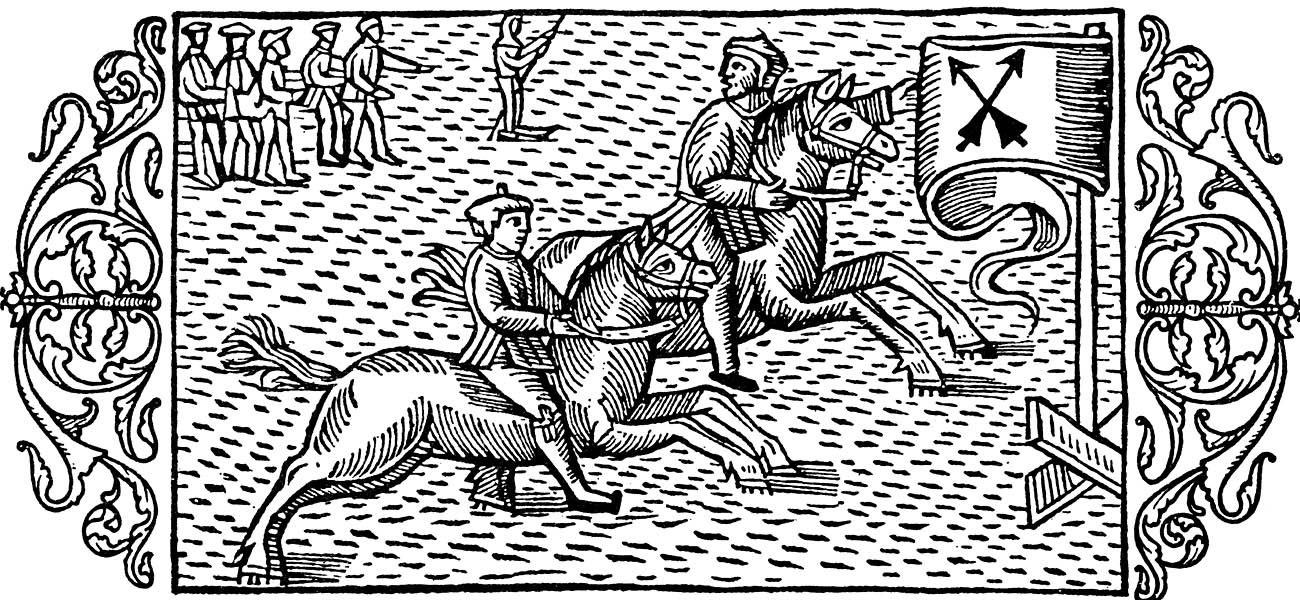
Horse racing in Sweden, c. 1555

==== Belgium ====
Horse racing in Belgium takes place at three venues – Hippodrome Wellington in Ostend (opened in 1883 in honour of Arthur Wellesley, 1st Duke of Wellington), Hippodroom Waregem in Waregem in Flanders and Hippodrome de Wallonie in Mons, Wallonia.

==== Czech Republic ====
There are 15 racecourses in the Czech Republic, most notably Pardubice Racecourse, where the country's most famous race, the Velka Pardubicka steeplechase, has been run since 1874. However, the first official race was organized back in 1816 by Emperor Francis II near Kladruby nad Labem. The Czech horse racing season usually starts at the beginning of April and ends sometime in November. Racing takes place mostly at weekends and there is usually one meeting on a Saturday and one on Sunday. Horse races, as well as Thoroughbred horse breeding, is organized by Jockey Club Czech Republic, founded in 1919.

==== France ====
France has a major horse racing industry. It is home to the famous Prix de l'Arc de Triomphe held at Longchamp Racecourse, the richest race in Europe and the third richest turf race in the world after the Japan Cup and the Everest with a prize of 4 million Euros (approximately US$4.2 million). Other major races include the Grand Prix de Paris, the Prix du Jockey Club (the French Derby) and the Prix de Diane. Besides Longchamp, France's other premier flat racecourses include Chantilly and Deauville. There is also a smaller but nevertheless important jumps racing sector, with Auteuil Racecourse being the best known. The sport's governing body is France Galop.

==== Great Britain ====
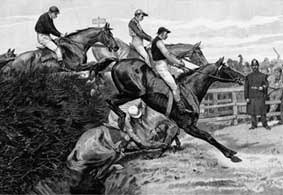
1890 engraving of horses jumping the Becher's Brook fence in the Grand National. With treacherous fences combined with the distance (over 4 miles), the race has been called "the ultimate test of horse and rider".

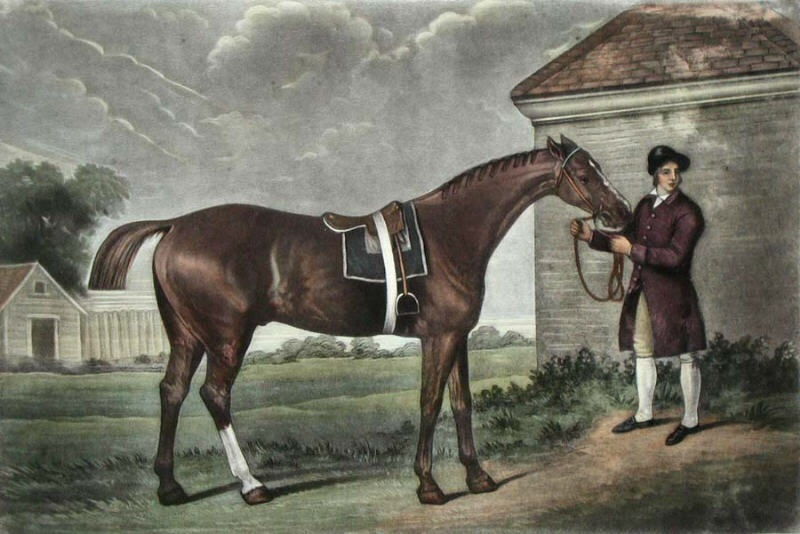
Eclipse, an undefeated British racehorse and outstanding sire.

Horse racing in Great Britain is predominantly thoroughbred flat and jumps racing. It was in Great Britain in the 17th to 19th centuries that many of the sport's rules and regulations were established. Named after Edward Smith-Stanley, 12th Earl of Derby, The Derby was first run in 1780. The race serves as the middle leg of the British Triple Crown, preceded by the 2000 Guineas and followed by the St Leger. The name "Derby" has since become synonymous with great races all over the world, and as such has been borrowed many times in races abroad.

The Grand National is the most prominent race in British culture, watched by many people who do not normally watch or bet on horse racing at other times of the year. Many of the sport's greatest jockeys, most notably Sir Gordon Richards, have been British. The sport is regulated by the British Horseracing Authority. The BHA's authority does not extend to Northern Ireland; racing in Ireland is governed on an All-Ireland basis.

==== Greece ====
Despite having an ancient tradition with well-documented history, all racetracks in Greece have ceased operation due to the Greek government-debt crisis.

==== Hungary ====
Hungary has a long-standing horse racing tradition. The first horse racing in Pest was noted on June 6, 1827. Although racing in Hungary is neither as popular nor as prestigious as it is in Western Europe, the country is notable for producing some fine international racehorses. Foremost of these is Kincsem, foaled in 1874 and the most successful Thoroughbred racehorse ever, having won 54 races in 54 starts. The country also produced Overdose, a horse who won his first 12 races, including group races in Germany and Italy, and finished fourth in the King's Stand Stakes at Royal Ascot.

==== Italy ====
Historically, Italy has been one of the leading European horse-racing nations, albeit in some respects behind Great Britain, Ireland, and France in size and prestige. The late Italian horse breeder Federico Tesio was particularly notable. In recent years, however, the sport in the country has suffered a major funding crisis, culminating in its 2014 expulsion from the European Pattern.

==== Netherlands ====
In Wassenaar in the Hague there is a grass course at Duindigt.

==== Poland ====
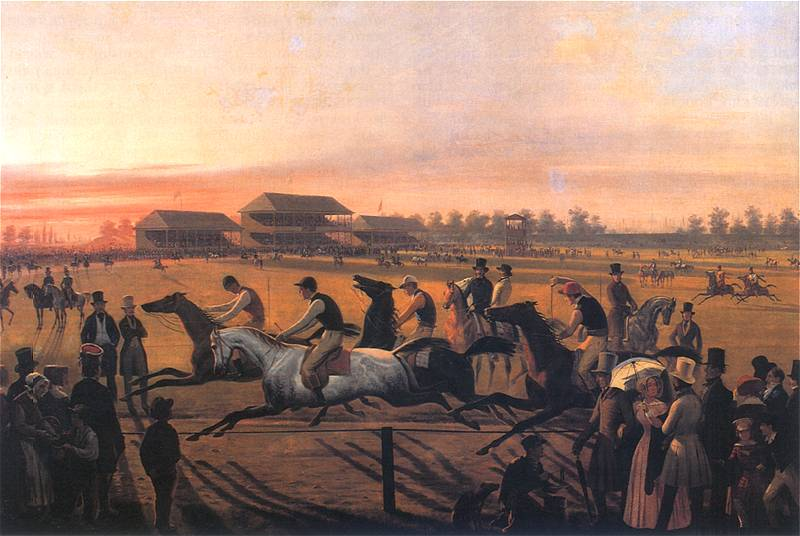
"First regular horse racing on Pola Mokotowskie in Warsaw" January Suchodolski 1849.

Horse racing in Poland can be dated to 1777, when a horse owned by Polish noble Kazimierz Rzewuski beat the horse of the English chargé d'affaires, Sir Charles Whitworth, on the road from Wola to Ujazdów Castle. The first regular horse racing was organized in 1841 on Mokotów Fields in Warsaw by Towarzystwo Wyścigów Konnych i Wystawy Zwierząt Gospodarskich w Królestwie Polskim (in English, the Society of Horse Racing in Congress Poland). The main racetrack in Poland is Warsaw's Służewiec Racecourse. The industry was severely limited during the Communist era, when gambling, the major source of funding, was made illegal.

==== Sweden ====
Harness racing (also known as trotting), is a popular sport in Sweden, with significant amounts of money wagered annually.

=== Oceania ===
==== Australia ====
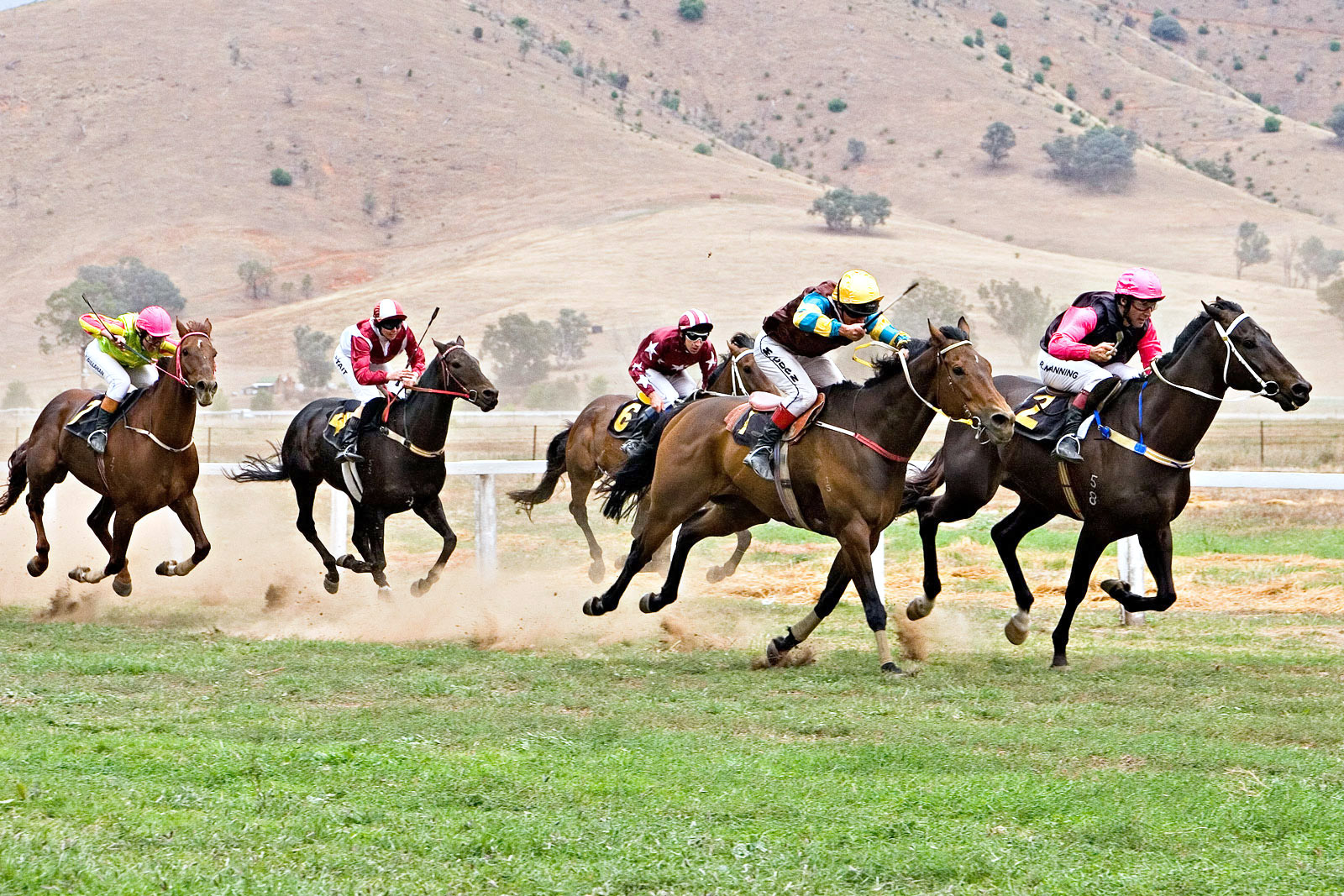
Tambo Valley Picnic Races, Victoria, Australia 2006

Horse racing in Australia was founded during the early years of settlement and the industry has grown to be among the top three leading Thoroughbred racing nations of the world. The world-famous Melbourne Cup, the race that stops a nation, has recently attracted many international entries. In country racing, records indicate that Goulburn commenced racing in 1834. Australia's first country racing club was established at Wallabadah in 1852 and the Wallabadah Cup is still held on New Year's Day (the current racecourse was built in 1898).

In Australia, the most famous racehorse was Phar Lap (bred in New Zealand), who raced from 1928 to 1932. Phar Lap carried 9 st 12 lb (62.5 kg) to win the 1930 Melbourne Cup. Australian steeplechaser Crisp is remembered for his battle with Irish champion Red Rum in the 1973 Grand National. In 2003–2005 the mare Makybe Diva (bred in Great Britain) became the only racehorse to ever win the Melbourne Cup three times, let alone in consecutive years. Still more recently, another mare, Winx. won the prestigious Cox Plate four straight times, and set a modern-era world record for most consecutive race wins by a Thoroughbred, winning the last 33 races of her career. In harness racing, Cane Smoke had 120 wins, including 34 in a single season, Paleface Adios became a household name during the 1970s, while Cardigan Bay, a pacing horse from New Zealand, enjoyed great success at the highest levels of American harness racing in the 1960s. More recently, Blacks A Fake has won four Inter Dominion Championships, making him the only horse to complete this feat in Australasia's premier harness race.

Competitive endurance riding commenced in Australia in 1966, when the Tom Quilty Gold Cup was first held in the Hawkesbury district, near Sydney. The Quilty Cup is considered the National endurance ride and there are now over 100 endurance events contested across Australia, ranging in distances from 80 km to 400 km. The world's longest endurance ride is the Shahzada 400 km Memorial Test which is conducted over five days traveling 80 kilometers a day at St Albans on the Hawkesbury River, New South Wales. In all endurance events there are rigorous checks by veterinarians, conducted before, during, and after the competition.

==== New Zealand ====
Racing is a long-established sport in New Zealand, stretching back to colonial times.

Horse racing is a significant part of the New Zealand economy which in 2004 generated 1.3% of the GDP. The indirect impact of expenditures on racing was estimated to have generated more than $1.4 billion in economic activity in 2004 and created 18,300 full-time equivalent jobs. More than 40,000 people were involved in some capacity in the New Zealand racing industry in 2004. In 2004, more than one million people attended race meetings in New Zealand. There are 69 Thoroughbred and 51 harness clubs licensed in New Zealand. Racecourses are situated in 59 locations throughout New Zealand.

The bloodstock industry is important to New Zealand, with the export sale of horses – mainly to Australia and Asia – generating more than $120 million a year. During the 2008–09 racing season 19 New Zealand bred horses won 22 Group One races around the world.

Notable thoroughbred racehorses from New Zealand include Carbine, Nightmarch, Sunline, Desert Gold and Rising Fast. Phar Lap and Tulloch were both bred in New Zealand but did not race there.

The most famous New Zealand standardbred horse is probably Cardigan Bay. Stanley Dancer drove the New Zealand bred horse, Cardigan Bay to win $1 million in stakes in 1968, the first harness horse to surpass that milestone in American history. Other horses of note include Young Quinn, Christian Cullen, Lazarus and the trotter Lyell Creek.

=== Africa ===
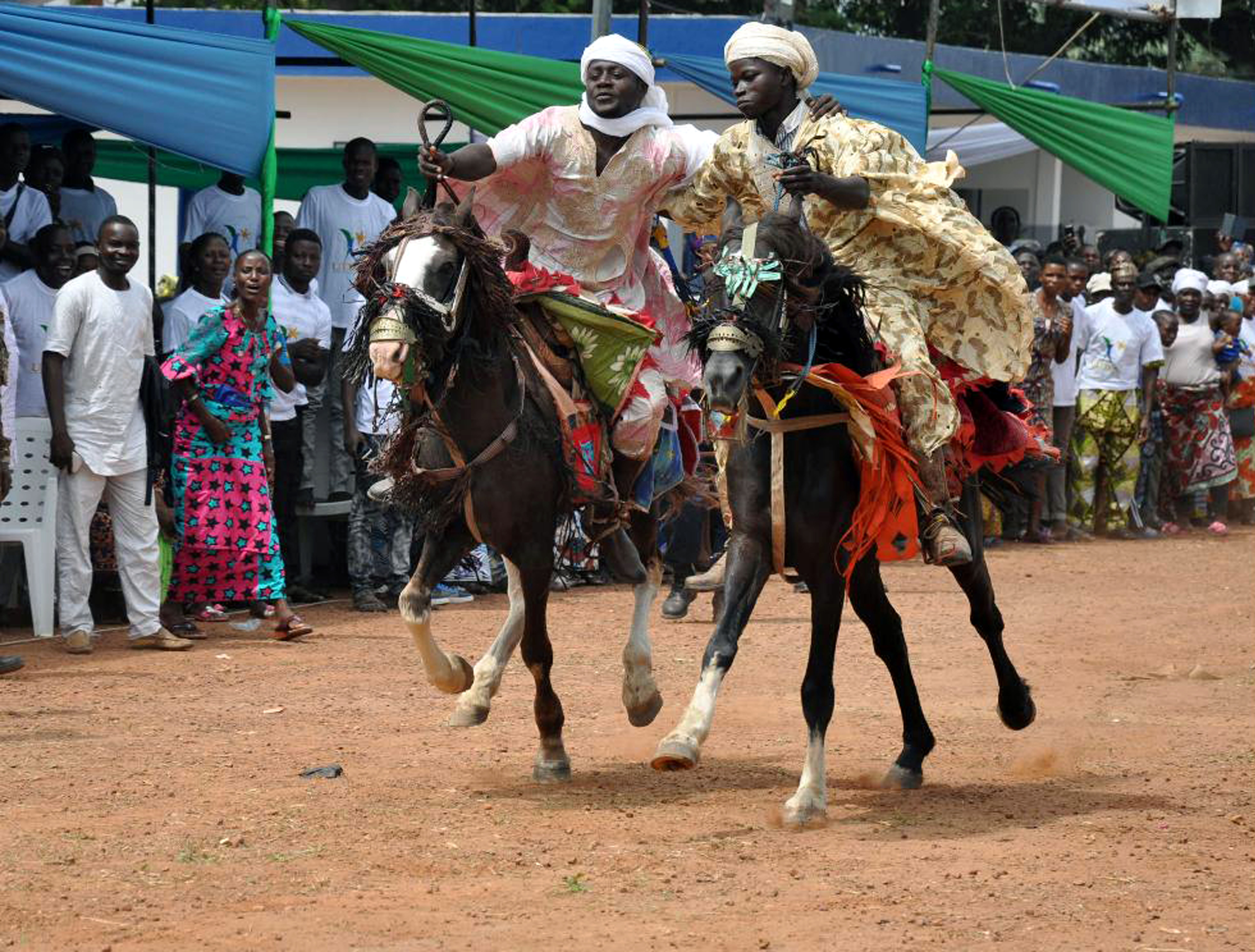
Horse race in Benin, Africa

==== Mauritius ====
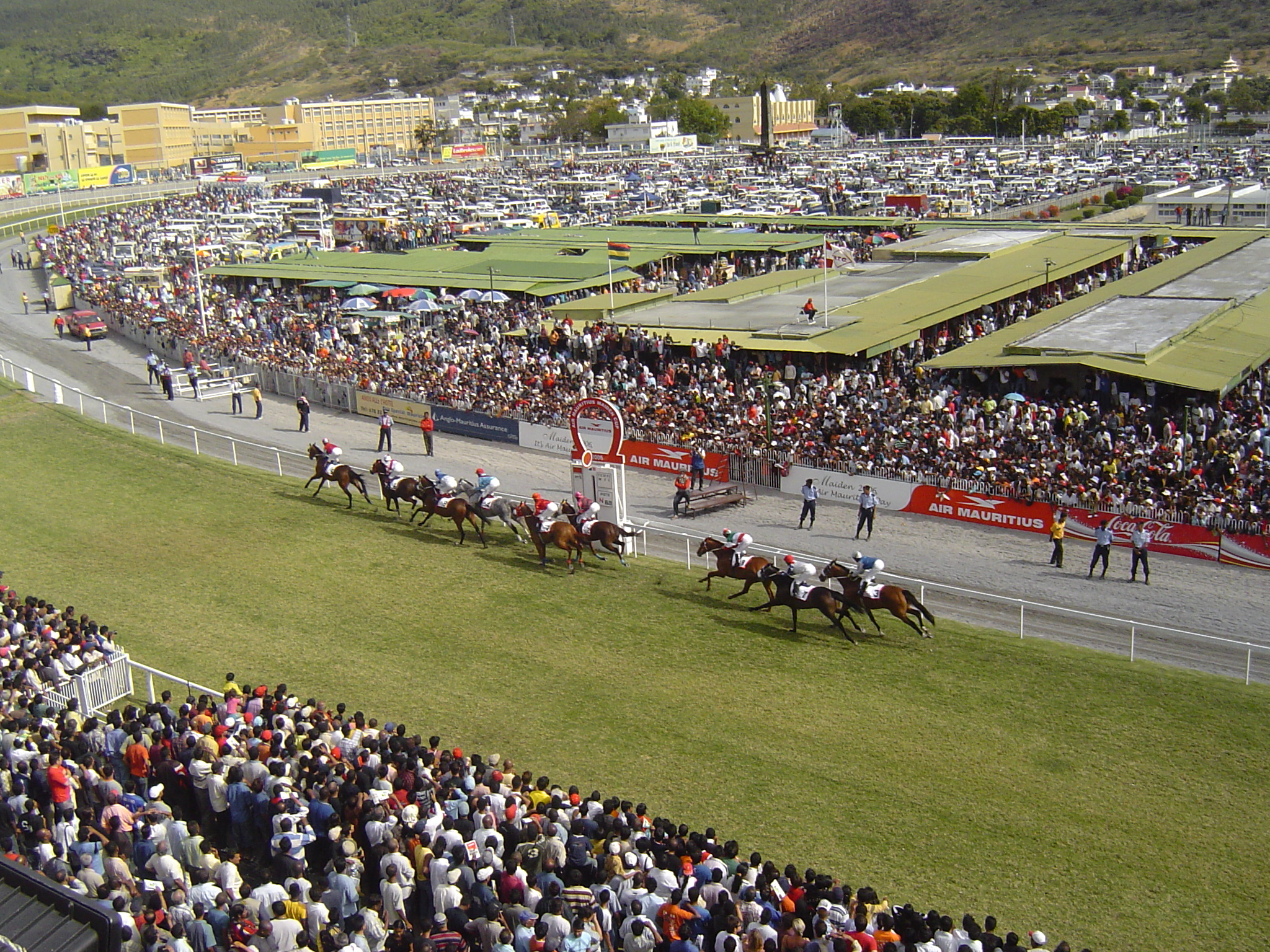
Maiden Cup 2006 - To The Line, winner of the race

On 25 June 1812, the Champ de Mars Racecourse was inaugurated by The Mauritius Turf Club which was founded earlier in the same year by Colonel Edward A. Draper. The Champ de Mars is situated on a prestigious avenue in Port Louis, the capital city and is the oldest racecourse in the Southern Hemisphere. The Mauritius Turf Club is the second oldest active turf club in the world.

Racing is one of the most popular sports in Mauritius now attracting regular crowds of 20,000 people or more to the only racecourse of the island.

A high level of professionalism has been attained in the organization of races over the last decades preserving the ambiance prevailing on race days at the Champ de Mars.

Members of the British royal family, such as Queen Elizabeth II, Princess Margaret or Queen Elizabeth The Queen Mother have attended or patronized races at the Champ de Mars numerous times.

Champ de Mars has four classic events a year such as the Duchess of York Cup, the Barbé Cup, the Maiden Cup, and the Duke of York Cup.

Most of the horses are imported from South Africa but some are also acquired from Australia, the United Kingdom and France.

==== South Africa ====
Horse racing is a popular sport in South Africa that can be traced back to 1797. The first recorded race club meeting took place five years later in 1802. The national horse racing body is known as the National Horseracing Authority and was founded in 1882. The premier event, which attracts 50,000 people to Durban, is the Durban July Handicap, which has been run since 1897 at Greyville Racecourse. It is the largest and most prestigious event on the continent, with betting running into the hundreds of millions of Rands. Several July winners have gone on to win major international races, such as Colorado King, London News, and Ipi Tombe. However, the other notable major races are the Summer Cup, held at Turffontein Racecourse in Johannesburg, and The Sun Met, which is held at Kenilworth Racecourse in Cape Town.

=== Asia ===
==== China ====
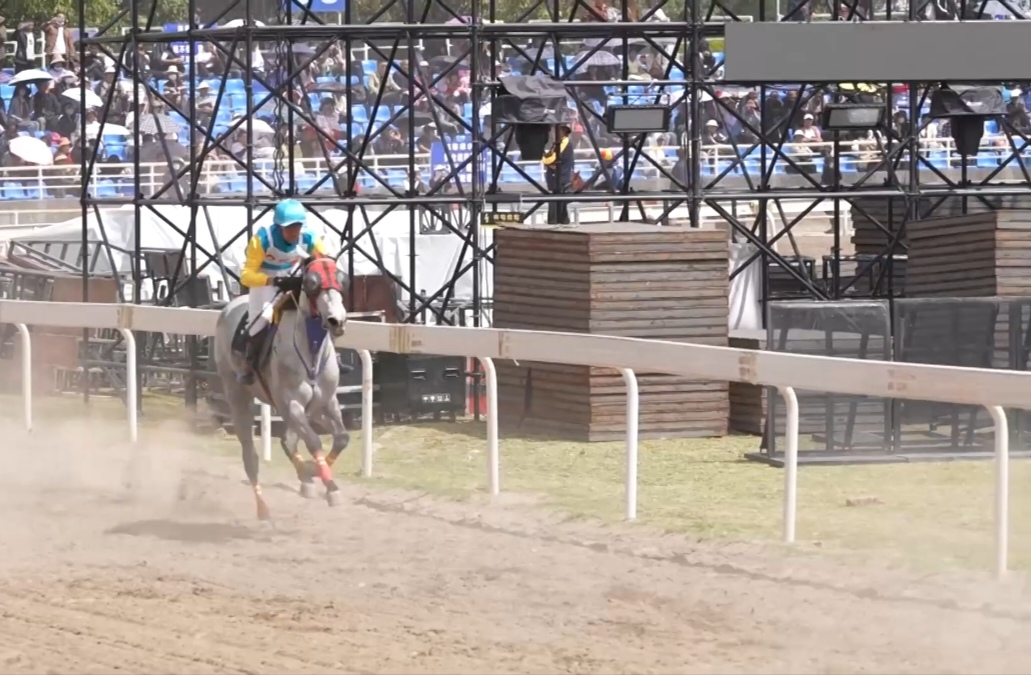
Horse racing held at Third Month Fair in Yunnan, 2024

Horse racing in one form or another has been a part of Chinese culture for millennia. Horse racing was a popular pastime for the aristocracy at least by the Zhou dynasty – 4th century B.C. General Tian Ji's stratagem for a horse race remains perhaps the best-known story about horse racing in that period. In the 18th and 19th centuries, horse racing and equestrian sports in China was dominated by Mongol influences.

Thoroughbred horse racing came to China with British settlements in the middle 1800s and most notably centered around the treaty ports, including the two major race courses in Shanghai, the Shanghai Racecourse and the International Recreation Grounds (in Kiang-wan), and the racecourses of Tianjin. The Kiang-wan racecourse was destroyed in the lead-up to the Second Sino-Japanese War and the Shanghai Race Club closed in 1954. The former Shanghai Racecourse is now People's Square and People's Park and the former club building was the Shanghai Art Museum.

As Hong Kong and Macau are Special Administrative Regions, they are exempted from the ban on gambling on mainland China. (See below)

Horse racing was banned in the Republic of China in 1945, and the People's Republic of China maintained the ban after 1949, although allowances were made for ethnic minority peoples for whom horse sports are a cultural tradition. Speed horse racing (速度赛马) was an event in the National Games of China, mainly introduced to cater to minority peoples, such as the Mongols. The racecourse was initially 5 km, but from 2005 (the 10th National Games) was extended to 12 km. The longer race led to deaths and injuries to participating horses in both 2005 and the 11th National Games in 2009. Also, with the entry into the sport of Han majority provinces such as Hubei, which are better funded and used Western, rather than traditional, breeding and training techniques, meant that the original purpose of the event to foster traditional horse racing for groups like the Mongols was at risk of being usurped. At the 2009 National Games, Hubei won both the gold and silver medals, with Inner Mongolia winning bronze. As a result of these factors, the event was abolished for the 12th National Games in 2013.

Club horse racing reappeared on a small scale in the 1990s. In 2008, the China Speed Horse Race Open in Wuhan was organized as the qualification round for the speed horse race event at the National Games the next year, but was also seen by commentators as a step towards legalizing both horse racing and gambling on the races. The Wuhan Racecourse was the only racecourse that organized races in China. In 2014, the Wuhan Jockey Club organized more than 80 races. Almost all Chinese trainers and jockeys stabled in Wuhan. However, with the demise of the event at the National Games and the government not relenting from the ban on commercial racing, various racecourses built in recent years are all in a state of disuse: The Nanjing Racecourse, which previously hosted National Games equestrian events, is now used as a car park; the Beijing Jockey Club was shut down in 2008. The racecourse in Inner Mongolia has not been active since 2012.

Horse racing eventually returned to mainland China in 2014 as a one-day, five-card event for foreign horses, trainers and jockeys. Standardized horse racing events have gradually re-emerged in China.

==== Hong Kong ====
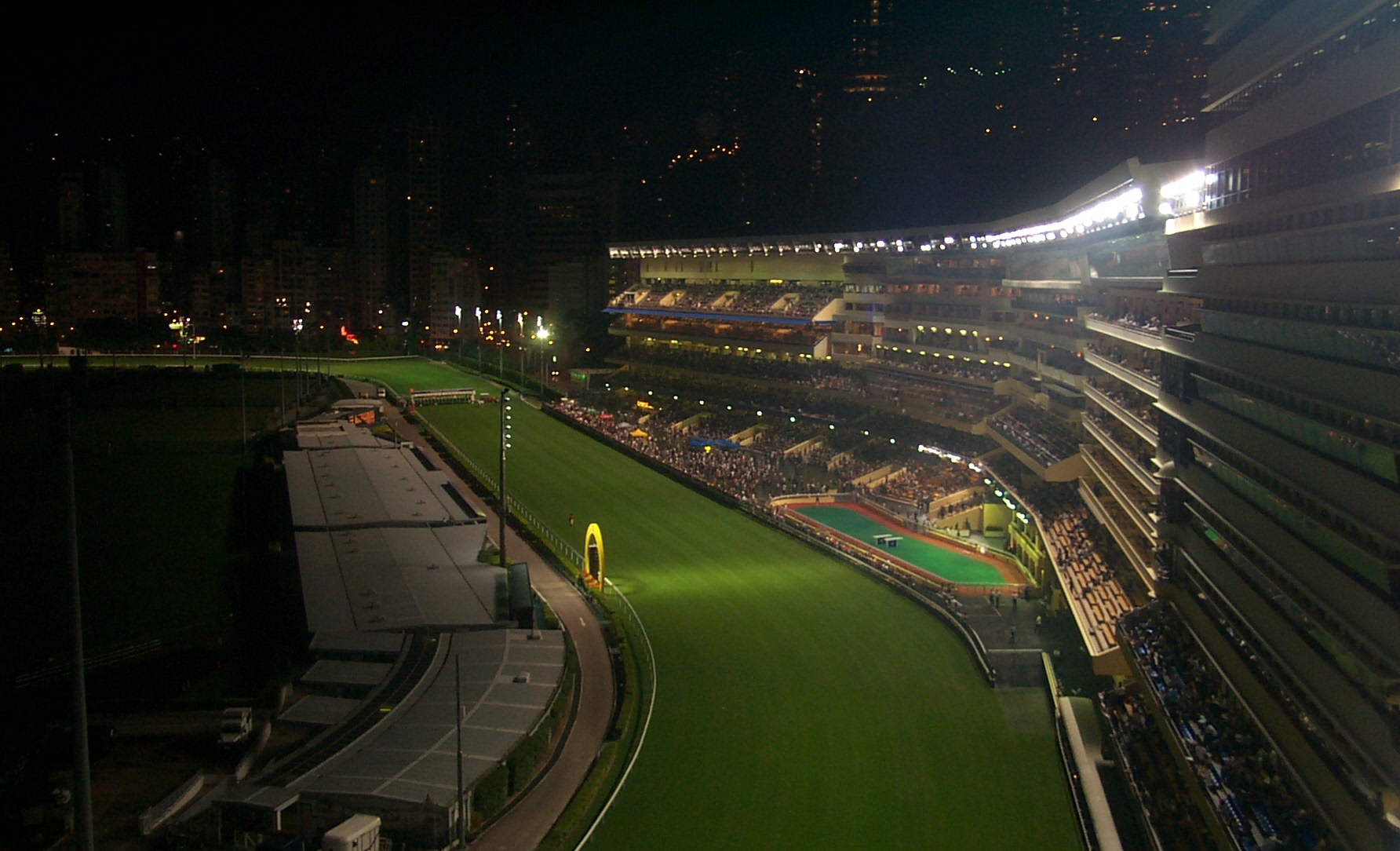
Happy Valley Racecourse in Hong Kong at night

The British tradition of horse racing left its mark with the creation of one of the most important entertainment and gambling institutions in Hong Kong. Established as the Royal Hong Kong Jockey Club in 1884, the non-profit organization conducts nearly 700 races every season at the two race tracks: Happy Valley and Sha Tin.

All horses are imported, as Hong Kong has no breeding industry. The sport annually draws millions of dollars of tax revenue. Off-track betting is available from overseas bookmakers.

Today, the Hong Kong Jockey Club is a cornerstone of modern Hong Kong. It donates all its profits to the Hong Kong government, charities and public institutions. It is the territory's largest taxpayer, contributing 11% of the government's revenues in 2000. In economic terms, the Hong Kong Jockey Club is an old-fashioned government-protected monopoly; all other forms of gambling are illegal in this industry.

==== Macau ====
The Macau Trotting Club started in 1980, shutting down in 1988. In 1989, the Jockey Club of Macau was established for flat racing, closing after an unsuccessful year, to be purchased again in 1990. Racing resumed in 1991, peaking in 2003–2004, when more races were run in Macao than in Hong Kong. Racing was discontinued in 2024.

==== India ====
India's first racecourse was set up in Madras in 1777, Guindy race course. Today India has nine racetracks operated by seven racing authorities.

==== Indonesia ====
Indonesia has several local horse racing traditions including West Sumatra's pacu kudo and Bima's pacoa jara. Modern flats racing was first inroduced during the Dutch colonial era. Post-independence, all equestrian sports are governed by the Equestrian Association of Indonesia (PORDASI).

==== Japan ====
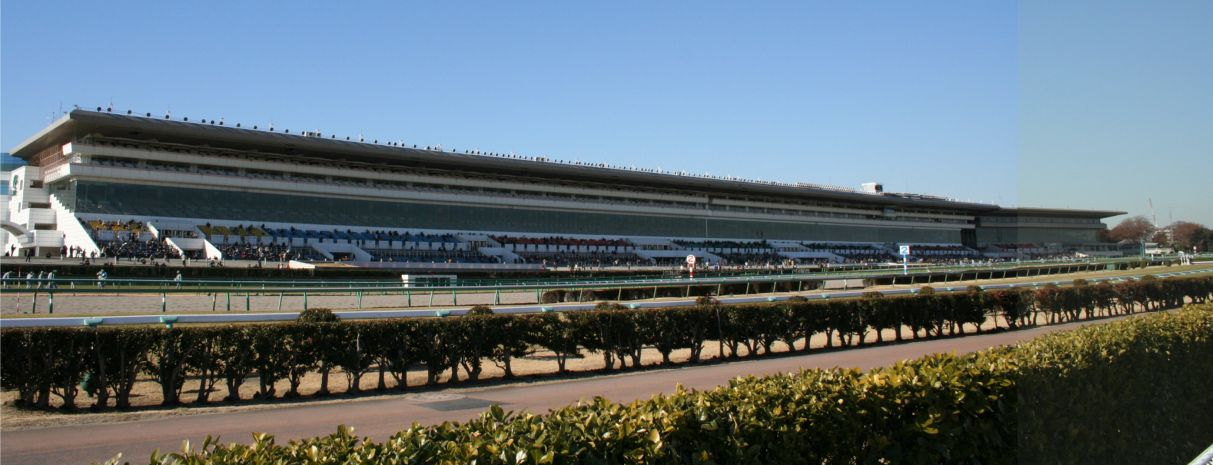
Nakayama Racecourse in Funabashi, Japan

Japan has two governing bodies that control its horseracing – the Japan Racing Association (JRA), and National Association of Racing (NAR). Between them they conduct more than 21,000 horse races a year. The JRA is responsible for horseracing events at ten major racecourses in metropolitan areas, while the NAR is responsible for various local horseracing events throughout Japan. Racing in Japan is mainly flat racing, but Japan also has jump racing and a sled-pulling race known as Ban'ei (also called Draft Racing).

Japan's top stakes races are run in the spring, autumn, and winter. These include the country's most prominent race – the Grade 1 Japan Cup, a 2,400 m (about 1½ mile) invitational turf race run every November at Tokyo Racecourse for a purse of ¥476 million (about US$5.6 million), one of the richest turf races in the world. Other noted stakes races include the February Stakes, Japanese Derby, Takamatsunomiya Kinen, Yasuda Kinen, Takarazuka Kinen, Arima Kinen, Satsuki Sho, Kikka Sho, and the Tennō Shō races run in the spring and fall. Japan's top jump race is the Nakayama Grand Jump, run every April at Nakayama Racecourse.

==== Malaysia ====
In Malaysia, horse racing was introduced during the British colonial era and remains to the present day as a gambling activity. There are three race courses in Peninsular Malaysia, namely Penang Turf Club, Perak Turf Club, and Selangor Turf Club. Within and only within the turf clubs, betting on horse racing is a legal form of gambling. Racing in Peninsular Malaysia and Singapore is conducted and governed under the Rules of the Malayan Racing Association and betting in Malaysia is operated and organized by Pan Malaysian Pools Sdn Bhd. In East Malaysia, races are governed independently by the Royal Sabah Turf Club and the Sarawak Turf Club.

==== Mongolia ====
Mongolian horse racing takes place during the Naadam festival. Mongolia does not have Thoroughbred horse racing. Rather, it has its own Mongolian style of horse racing in which the horses run for at least a distance of 25 kilometers.

==== Pakistan ====
Horse races are held in Pakistan at four clubs. In Lahore at Lahore Race Club, Rawalpindi at Chakri, in Karachi at Karachi Race Club, and in Gujrat at Gujrat Race Club.

==== Philippines ====
Horseracing in the Philippines began in 1867. The history of Philippine horseracing has three divisions according to the breeds of horses used. They are the Philippine-pony era (1867–1898), the Arabian-horse era (1898–1930), and the Thoroughbred-era (1935–present).

==== Saudi Arabia ====
Horce races are mainly held at the King Abdulaziz Racetrack, which hosts the richest thoroughbred horse race; the Saudi Cup.

==== Singapore ====
Horse racing was introduced to Singapore by the British in 1843, and remained one of the legal forms of gambling after independence. It was a highly popular form of entertainment with the local Singaporean community for 181 years. Races were typically held on Friday evenings and Sundays at the Singapore Turf Club in Kranji. Horse racing also left its mark in the naming of roads in Singapore such as Race Course Road in Little India, where horse racing was first held in Singapore, and Turf Club Road in Bukit Timah where Singapore Turf Club used to be situated before moving to its final location in 1999. In-person attendance at horse races declined dramatically during the 2010s, and after the COVID-19 pandemic the 30,000-seat grandstand was regularly filled to less than 10% capacity. The racetrack was finally closed in October 2024, its land reclaimed by the government to make way for public housing.

==== South Korea ====
Horse racing in South Korea dates back to May 1898, when a foreign language institute run by the government included a donkey race in its athletic rally. However, it wasn't until the 1920s that modern horse racing involving betting developed. The nation's first authorised club, the Chosun Racing Club, was established in 1922 and a year later, the pari-mutuel betting system was officially adopted for the first time.

The Korean War disrupted the development of horse racing in the country, but after the Seoul Olympics in 1988, the Olympic Equestrian Park was converted into racing facilities named Seoul Race Park, which helped the sport to develop again.

==== Thailand ====
The first horse race in Thailand took place in 1897, following King Chulalongkorn's visit to Europe. Racecourses were soon established in exclusive sports clubs, most notably the Royal Bangkok Sports Club (RBSC), founded in 1901. Royal Turf Club of Thailand followed in 1916. Betting on horse races is one of the few legal forms of gambling in Thailand.

The sport became highly popular during the mid-twentieth century but has largely declined since then.

==== Turkey ====
Horses have played an important role in Turks' lives throughout history, highlighted by a 2000 year old inscription detailing rules of horseracing, and the hippodrome of Constantinople built in AD 203. During the Ottoman Empire in the 16th century, cross-country races of about 15 miles were run.

The first modern horse racing dates to 1856 in İzmir. After the Republic of Turkey was established in 1923 by Mustafa Kemal Atatürk, the number of breeding and racing Arabian and Thoroughbred racehorses accelerated rapidly, especially after the beginning of the 1930s. The Jockey Club of Turkey, founded in 1950, was the turning point of both the Turkish breeding and racing industries.

==== United Arab Emirates ====
The big race in the UAE is the Dubai World Cup, a race with a purse of US$12 million, which was the largest purse in the world until being surpassed by the Saudi Cup, a race in Riyadh with a $20 million purse that held its first edition in 2020. Other races include the Dubai Kahayla Classic with a purse of US$250,000.

The Meydan Racecourse in Dubai, reportedly the world's largest race track, opened on March 27, 2010, for the Dubai World Cup race. The race track complex contains two tracks with seating for 60,000, a hotel, restaurants, theater and a museum.

There is no parimutuel betting in the UAE as gambling is illegal.

=== South America ===
==== Argentina ====
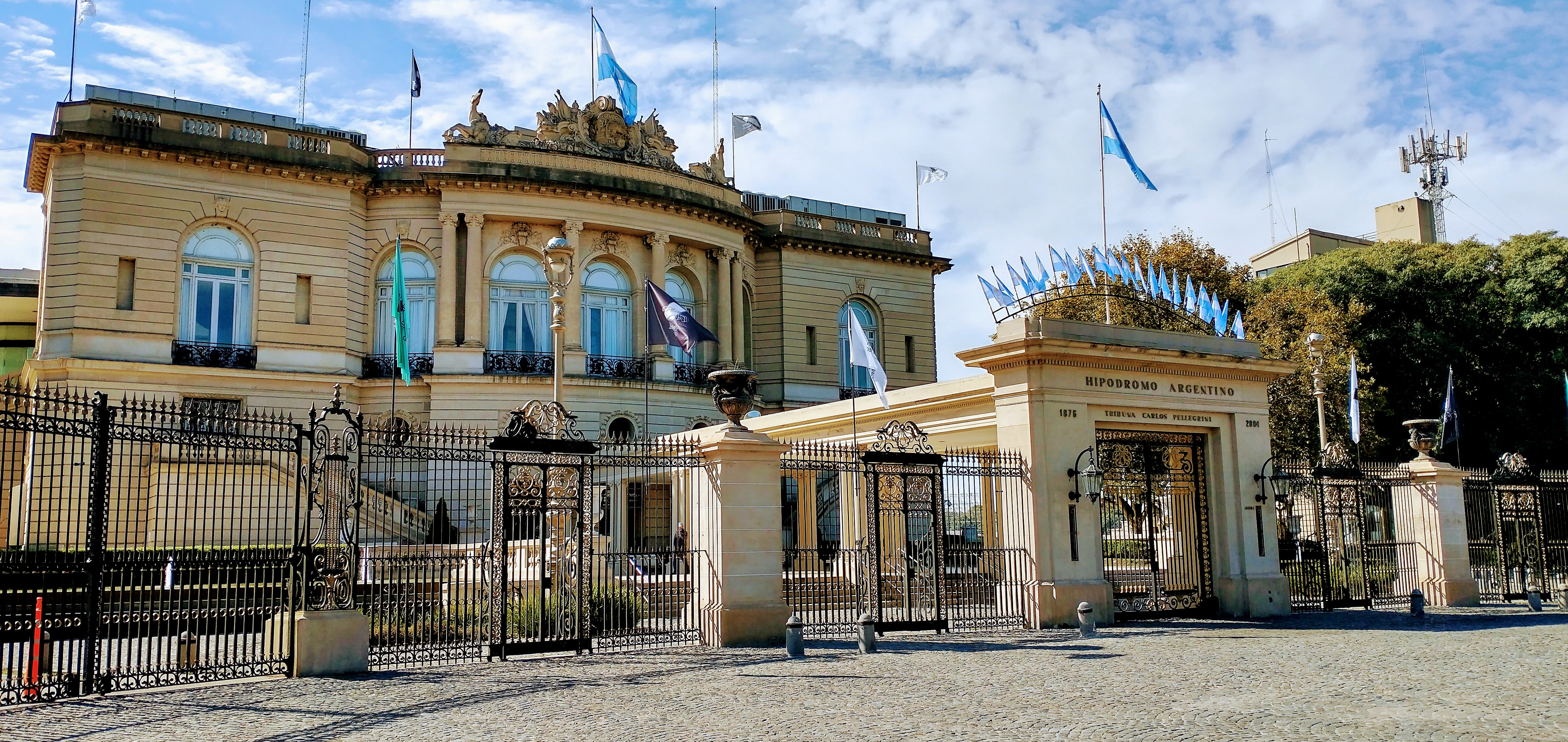
The Hipódromo Argentino de Palermo, the main racecourse in Buenos Aires

In Argentina the sport is known as turf. Some of the most famous racers are Irineo Leguisamo, Vilmar Sanguinetti, Marina Lezcano, Jorge Valdivieso, Pablo Falero and Jorge Ricardo. The most notable Argentine horse of recent decades is Invasor, who won Uruguay's Triple Crown in 2005; won four U.S. Grade I races in 2006, including the Breeders' Cup Classic, on his way to being named that country's Horse of the Year; and ended his racing career in 2007 with two more Grade I/Group One wins, including the Dubai World Cup.

Carlos Gardel's tango Por una cabeza is about horse racing, a sport of which he was a known fan. Gardel was a good friend of Irineo Leguisamo, who is the most recognized Uruguayan jockey, who raced numerous years in Argentine.

== Betting ==
At many horse races, there is a gambling station, where gamblers can stake money on a horse. Gambling on horses is prohibited at some tracks; Springdale Race Course, home of the nationally renowned TD Bank Carolina Cup and Colonial Cup Steeplechase in Camden, South Carolina, is known as one of the tracks where betting is illegal, due to a 1951 law. Where gambling is allowed, most tracks offer parimutuel betting where gamblers' money is pooled and shared proportionally among the winners once a deduction is made from the pool. In some countries, such as the UK, Ireland, and Australia, an alternative and more popular facility is provided by bookmakers who effectively make a market in odds. This allows the gambler to "lock in" odds on a horse at a particular time (known as "taking the price" in the UK). Parimutuel gambling on races also provides not only purse money to participants but considerable tax revenue, with over $100 billion wagered annually in 53 countries.

== Deaths and injuries ==
Anna Waller, a member of the Department of Emergency Medicine at the University of North Carolina, co-authored a four-year-long study of jockey injuries and stated to The New York Times that "For every 1,000 jockeys you have riding [for one year], over 600 will have medically treated injuries." She added that almost 20% of these were serious head or neck injuries. The study reported 6,545 injuries during the years 1993–1996. More than 100 jockeys were killed in the United States between 1950 and 1987.

Horses also face dangers in racing. 1.5 horses die out of every 1,000 starts in the United States. The U.S. Jockey Club in New York estimates that about 600 horses died at racetracks in 2006. The Jockey Club in Hong Kong reported a far lower figure of 0.58 horses per 1,000 starts. There is speculation that drugs used in horse racing in the United States, which are banned elsewhere, are responsible for the higher death rate in the United States.

In the Canadian province of Ontario, a study of 1,709 racehorse deaths between 2003 and 2015 found that the majority of deaths were attributable to "damage during exercise to the horses' musculoskeletal system", including fractures, dislocations, and tendon ruptures. Mortality rates were eight times higher for thoroughbreds than standardbreds, and highest amongst young horses. The study also found that the incidence of off-track deaths was twice as high for thoroughbreds.

In the United Kingdom, 186 horses were killed as a direct result of racing in 2019. Of these 145 died in National Hunt (jump) racing and 41 in flat racing. A report published in 2005 estimated that "around 375 horses who are entered into races each season die from their injuries, or they are killed because they are considered of no further commercial value, even though they are young enough to continue racing." It added, "Reasons for horses being destroyed include broken legs, back, neck and pelvis; fatal spinal injuries, exhaustion, heart attack, and burst blood vessels in the lungs."

In Australia, a 2025 analysis by The Guardian reported that at least 174 racehorses died from racing or training-related injuries in the previous 12 months, based on a report released through the Coalition for the Protection of Racehorses (CPR) on Tuesday. The report noted that 138 horses died or were euthanised due to injuries sustained during races or training sessions. 85% of the deaths recorded were from front limb fatal injury.

== See also ==
- Australian and New Zealand punting glossary
- Fully automatic time
- Glossary of North American horse racing
- Going (horse racing)
- Horse length
- Horse racing equipment
- Jockey Challenge
- List of films about horses
- List of films about horse racing
- List of racehorses
- List of horse racing venues
- List of jockeys
- Match race

== Bibliography ==
- Edwards, Elwyn Hartley (1994). The Encyclopedia of the Horse. DK. ISBN 978-1564586148. ASIN 1564586146.
- "Horse-racing" . Encyclopædia Britannica (11th ed.). 1911.
