= BJC =

BJC is a three letter acronym that can mean many things:

- Balanced job complex, a way of organizing a workplace or group that is both directly democratic and also creates relative equal empowerment among all people involved.
- Baptist Joint Committee for Religious Liberty, a church-state affairs group in Washington
- Beijing-Benz DaimlerChrysler Automotive (Beijing Jeep Corporation)
- Beijing Jockey Club
- Bharatiya Jan Congress
- Bill Jefferson Clinton, an alternative to WJC (William Jefferson Clinton)
- BJC HealthCare, parent organization of Barnes-Jewish_Hospital
- Blankey Jet City
- British Journal of Cancer
- British Judo Council
- British Juggling Convention, an annual juggling convention held in the UK
- Bryce Jordan Center- A multi-purpose arena at Penn State University.
- Bubble Jet Colour - A line of inkjet printers by Canon Inc.
- Rocky Mountain Metropolitan Airport's FAA and IATA location identifier.
