= Pacoa jara =

Traditional form of Indonesian horse racing

Pacoa jara; Pacoa jara mbojo
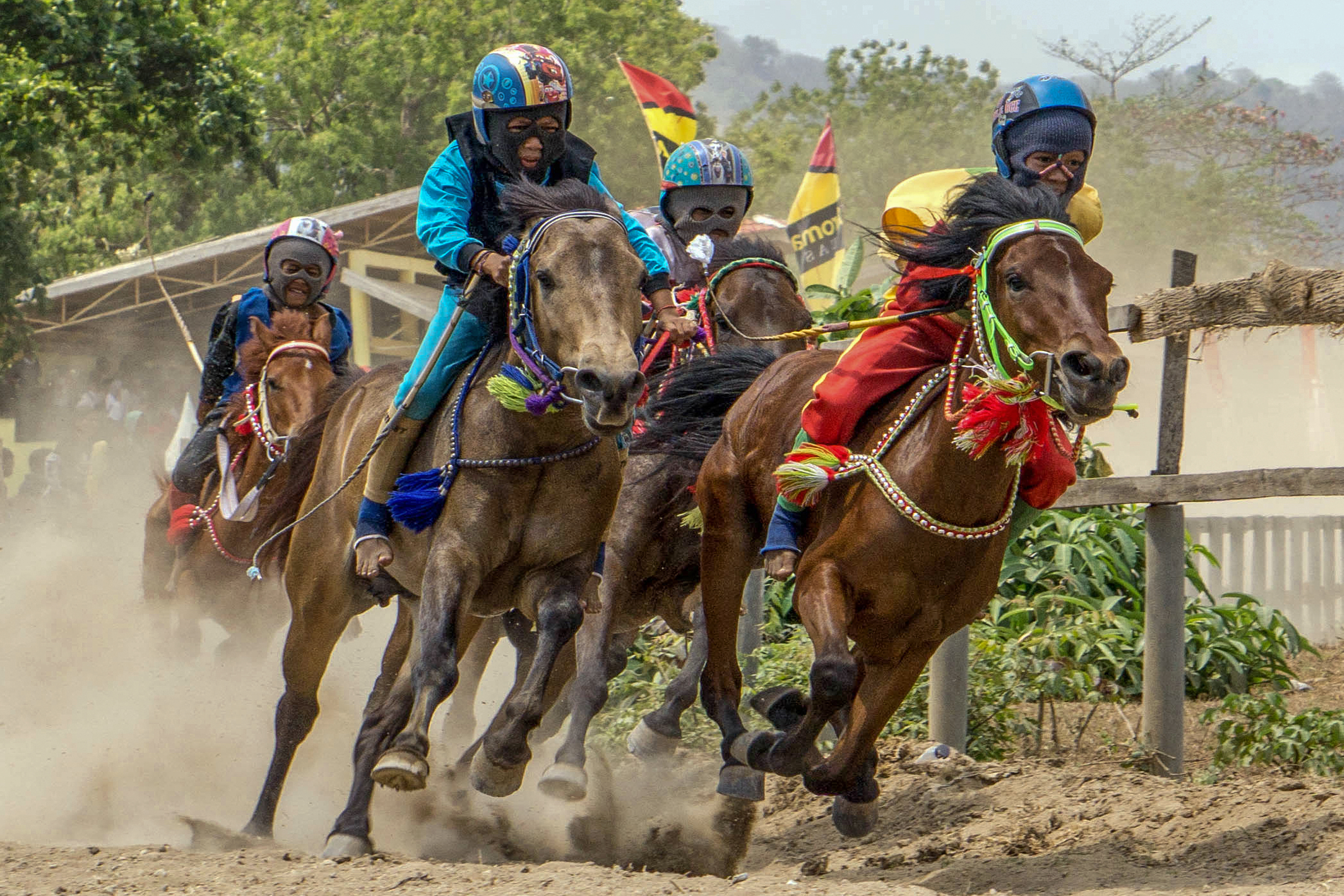
- The pamaco jara (jockeys) of a pacoa jara race in Bima, Sumbawa, West Nusa Tenggara
- Types: traditional horse racing
- Originating culture: Bimanese people
- Originating era: since 1900s

Pacoa jara, also known as Pacoa jara mbojo (Bimanese: Bima horse racing), is a type of traditional sport and/or race unique to the Bimanese people, located in the city of Bima on Sumbawa Island in West Nusa Tenggara province, which usually uses Sandalwood ponies. Nowadays, pacoa jara has developed into an annual competition regularly organized by the Governments of Bima Regency, Bima City, and Dompu Regency. Since 2016, the government of Indonesia has officially recognized pacoa jara as an Intangible Cultural Heritage of Indonesia in the field of Traditional Skills and Craftsmanship originating from West Nusa Tenggara.

On average, the number of horses participating in these races can reach up to 800. The horses that compete are not only from Sumbawa Island; some come from various regions in Indonesia to participate.

== History ==
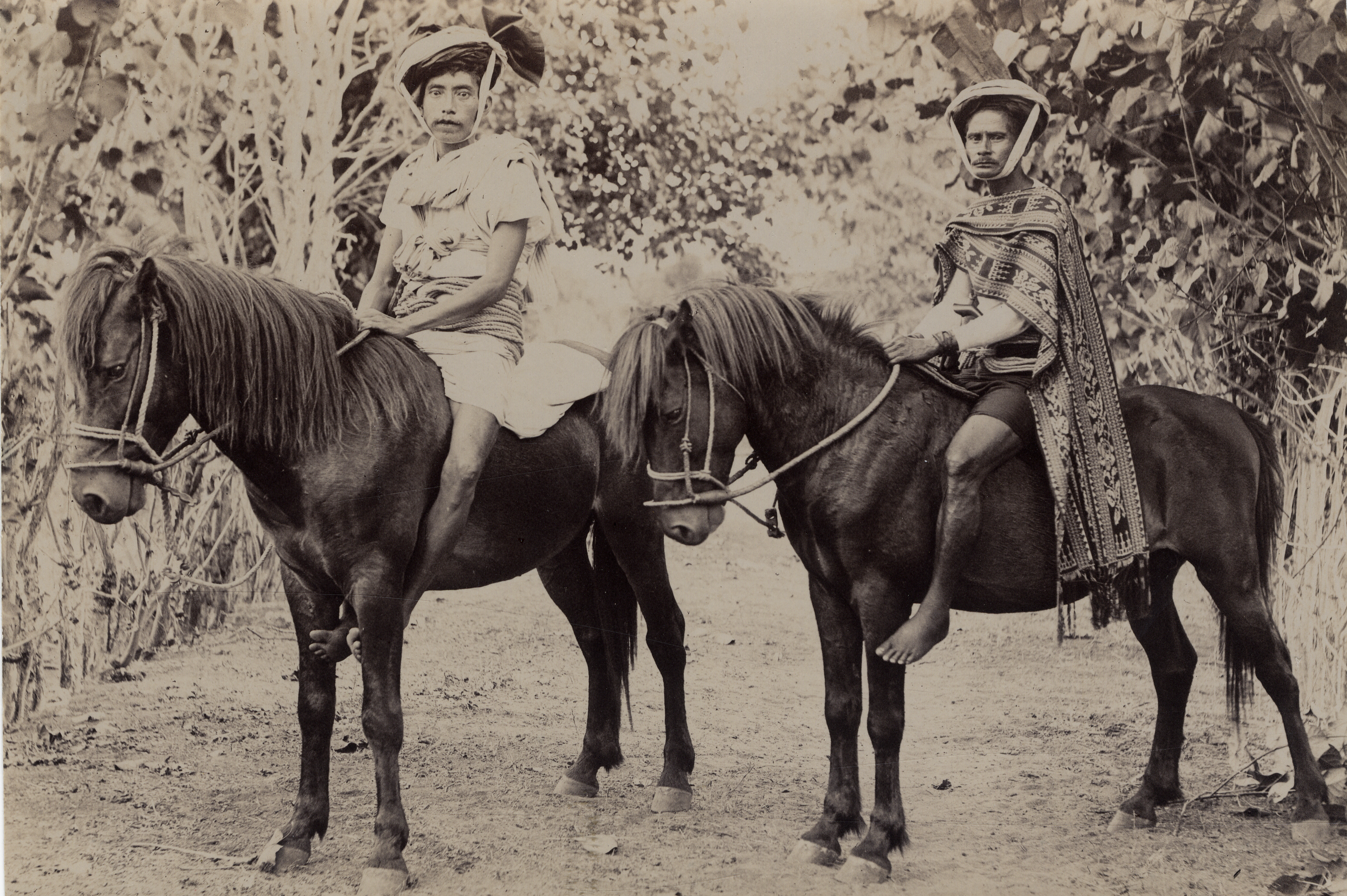
Two Bimanese men on horses

Pacoa jara has been practiced for centuries, especially by the Bima and Sumbawa ethnic groups through a traditional Sumbawan horse race called maen jaran.

Pacoa jara underwent massive revitalization mainly during the 1800s and 1900s. It began with the cavalry commander of the Bima Sultanate, known as Bumi Jara Nggampo, who selected horses for the Sultanate that would serve as war horses. The method used was to pit the horses against each other on the beach to test their strength and speed. Since then, the pacoa jara tradition became known and flourished among the Bima people as a traditional horse racing sport that is held annually.

On August 31, 1927, to commemorate the birthday of Queen Wilhelmina, a pacoa jara event was held at the Manggemaci Racecourse in Bima City. As Japan occupied the Dutch East Indies, Pacoa Jara was banned by the Japanese military government. At that time, the Japanese mobilized the people of Bima, especially men, to perform Romusha.

In the modern day, pacoa jara races are usually held on days of celebration such as Indonesian Independence Day.

== Classifications ==
In addition to the rules governing the techniques of pacoa jara, there are also regulations that classify racehorses into certain classes based on their physical condition and abilities. These classifications include:

- Teka Saru Class for beginner horses participating in a race for the first time (see maiden race);
- Teka Pas Class for horses that have participated in races 2-3 times;
- Teka A Class for experienced horses with a height between 117-120 centimeters;
- Teka B Class for experienced horses with a minimum height of 121 centimeters;
- OA Class for experienced horses with a height of 126 centimeters whose teeth have fallen out by 4;
- OB Class for experienced horses with a height between 127-129 centimeters;
- Harapan Class for experienced horses with a minimum height of 129 centimeters;
- Tunas Class for experienced horses with a minimum height of 129 centimeters and whose adult teeth have grown;
- Adult Class for adult-age horses.

== Ethical concerns ==
Pacoa jara jockeys are on average under ten years old, and thus the sport has been condemned by child welfare activists as child labour, exploitation and abuse. Arist Merdeka Sirait, chairman of the nonprofit National Commission for Child Protection, said that "This is clearly child exploitation. The horses move so fast. The boys ride the horses with no proper protection. This is violence against children. As children, they cannot say no to their parents or whoever ordered them to ride the horse." Sirat's organisation discovered cases of children being made to ride by men who were not the children's real fathers. In many cases, many of these child jockeys ended up skipping school, resulting in them dropping out and neglecting their education, focusing in pursue of horse racing.

Retno Listyarti, a commissioner at the Indonesian Child Protection Commission, a government organisation, said that the practice does not fall into Indonesia's definition of child abuse. Listyarti said that “By definition, exploitation means that the children do not get anything and they are unhappy about it, but in this case, it seems that the kids are happy, proud, and it is even a dream.”

Asikin Bin H. Mansur, a horse owner with three sons, two of which were former jockeys and the other being an active jockey, said that “I worry about [my son] falling and getting hurt, but it is a tradition here on the island and in my family. Sometimes if he falls, he gets injured and sometimes not. If Allah wants him to be injured, it’s his destiny.”

The child jockeys are paid around 50,000 to 100,000 rupiah per race in earlier rounds, and this can increase to 1 million rupiah in the finals. The minimum monthly wage in Sumbawa, where pacoa jara is common, is just over twice that. Betting is common at pacoa jara races although it is illegal in Indonesia.

Doping of horses is also common in local-level pacoa jara races. Edy Poky, a horse owner, told The Independent that “We buy doping medicine from Australia and online in Indonesia, and inject the horses in the morning and at night on race days to make them faster and improve their stamina”. Owners also rub chili powder and irritating plants into horses' hindquarters so they do not feel fatigue during races.

Pacoa jara is protected under Article 18B of the Constitution of Indonesia:

"The state acknowledges and respects the unity of customary law communities along with their traditional rights as long as they exist and are in accordance with the development of society and the principles of the Unitary State of the Republic of Indonesia."

== See also ==
- Pacu races — various traditional racing competitions of the Minangkabau people
- Horse racing in Indonesia
