= Hippodrome de Wallonie =

Horse racing venue in Mons, Wallonia, Belgium

Coordinates: 50°28′42″N 3°55′25″E

Hippodrome de Wallonie is a horse racing venue located in Ghlin, part of Mons, in Wallonia, Belgium. It is used for both trotting and flat racing.

== History ==
The company managing the hippodrome was created in 1999, at the initiative of the Walloon Region and the Fédération Nationale du Trot. One of the objectives was to provide trotting professionals with a permanent training site in Belgium.

The present grandstand was completed in 2003. It is located along the finishing straight and gives a direct view of the last turn and the finish line.

The site is also used for activities linked to the horse sector. The Centre provincial des Métiers du Cheval is located on the site and provides several forms of professional training related to horses.

== Racing ==
The hippodrome has two main tracks. The trotting track is 1,083 metres long and has a sand surface. The flat racing track is 1,345 metres long and uses a fibre-sand surface.

Races are organised during the year for both trotters and gallopers. Flat racing meetings at Mons have also been covered by Belgian public broadcaster RTBF.

One of the main races held at the venue is the Grand Prix de Wallonie, an international Group 1 harness race. In 2025, it was included in the UET Elite Circuit. The event has attracted leading European trotters, including Bold Eagle, Ready Cash and Timoko.
