= Beijing Jockey Club =

Chinese horse racing organization

Coordinates: 40.013433°N 116.695082°E

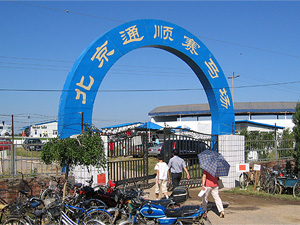

Beijing Jockey Club (BJC) was a Chinese horse racing organization. Located in the Tongzhou District of Beijing and covering an area of 1.6 square kilometres, it was one of the largest international standard horse-racing clubs in Asia. In 2001, with the approval of the state government, the club embarked on thoroughbred racing as a major business. The club bred over 2,000 thoroughbred horses. However, the Tongzhou racecourse was shut down on 23 October 2005. In the following month, over 600 horses were destroyed. The reason for the closure and the cull appears to have been loss of revenue, following the decision of the Chinese government not to allow gambling on horseracing. The club had previously operated a Tote system in 2003, apparently supported by the local government, but this had to be suspended in the 2004–05 season, following the government decision. The club is shut down.

The club had three racetracks which met international standards:

- turf track A: 2298 m
- turf track B: 2050 m
- dirt track S: 1850 m.
