= Pacu races =

Native Indonesian (Minangkabau) traditional races

Pacu (pə-CHOO; Minangkabau pronunciation: [ˈpat͡ʃu]), Minangkabau racing, or Minangkabau races is an umbrella term encompassing a range of traditional racing competitions rooted in the indigenous culture of Minangkabau – the world's largest matrilineal ethnic group, one of the natives of the Indonesian island of Sumatra. These Minangkabau popular races include Pacu Itiak (lit. 'duck racing'), Pacu Jalur (lit. 'watercraft racing'), Pacu Jawi (lit. 'bull racing'), and Pacu Kudo/Pacu Bugih (lit. 'horse racing'). Though differing in form and medium (land, water, and animal), all Pacu reflect deep cultural values tied to the agriculture, community celebration, fares forth, and ritual traditions of the native Minangkabau people.

Since 2009 the traditions, knowledge, cultural customs, biocentrism awareness, and the practices of Pacu races officially recognized and regarded by the Ministry of Education, Culture, Research, and Technology of Republic Indonesia as integral part of the National Intangible Cultural Heritage of Indonesia. As the effort to preserve these cultural heritage, the government of Indonesia support the Pacu races held annually in Sumatran regions (prominently in native Minangkabau realm areas) and promote its importance for the wider public both nationwide and international, the winner team of some Pacu race usually will also have a chance to be elected as the national athlete of Indonesia to represent Indonesia in the international racing events.

== Pacu Itiak ==
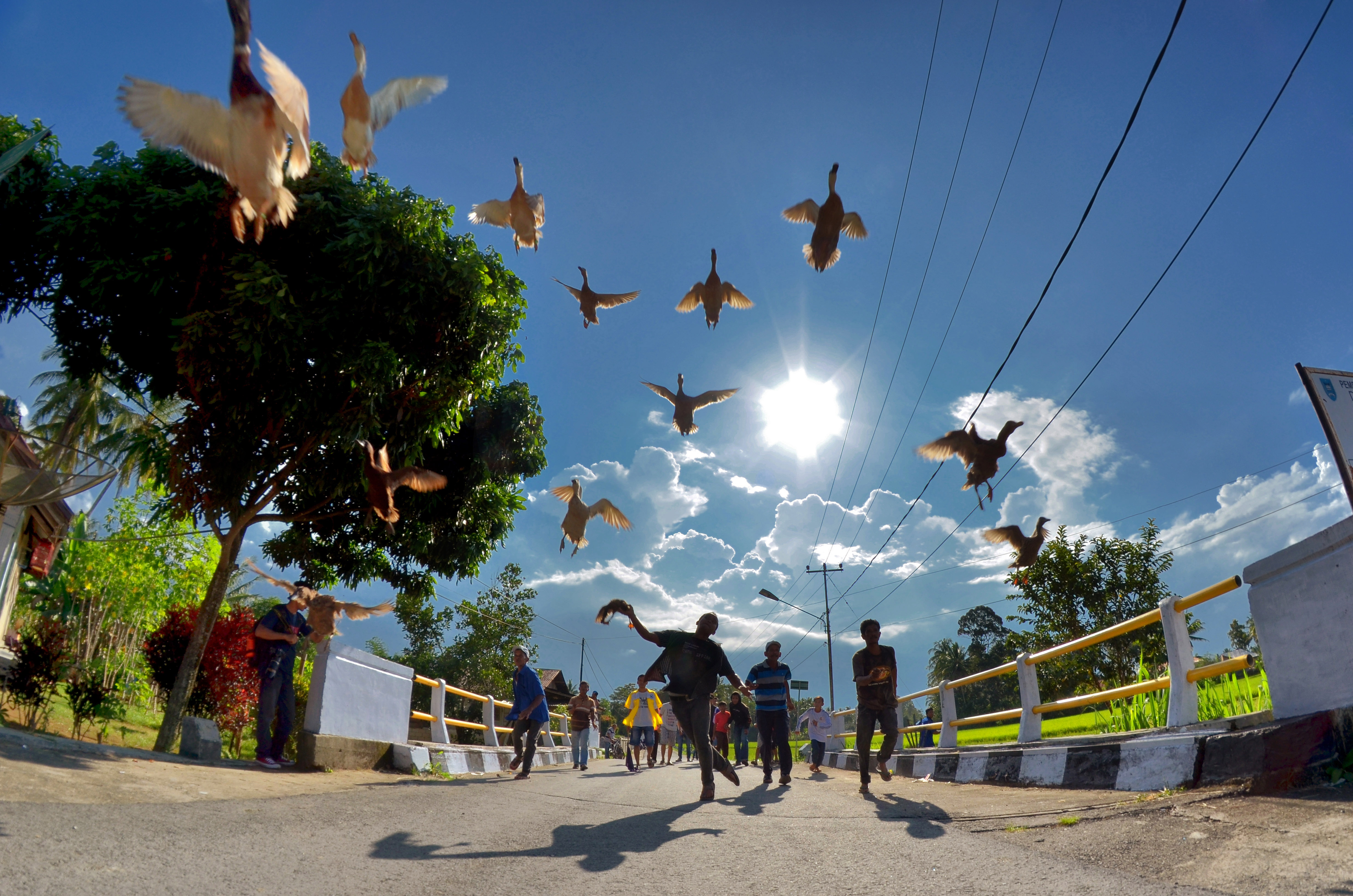
The 2020 Pacu Itiak event in Payakumbuah, West Sumatra.

Pacu Itiak is a unique traditional Minangkabau form of duck racing native to the Western Sumatran region of Payakumbuah and parts of the surrounding areas in Limo Puluah Koto. Pacu Itiak evolved from local customs and games involving domesticated ducks.

=== Mechanism ===
- Racing ducks are trained for long-distance sprinting.
- The race takes place on flat grass tracks, with distances of up to 800 meters.
- Minangkabau handlers release ducks toward the finish line; the fastest and most disciplined ducks win.

=== Cultural significance ===
Pacu Itiak reflects the native Minangkabau creativity and originally serves as traditional rural Minangkabau entertainment. The ducks particularly are also part of native food culture in Minangkabau culinary tradition, making them economically and symbolically important for the Minangkabau people. It highlights training skill and human-animal interaction.

== Pacu Jalur ==
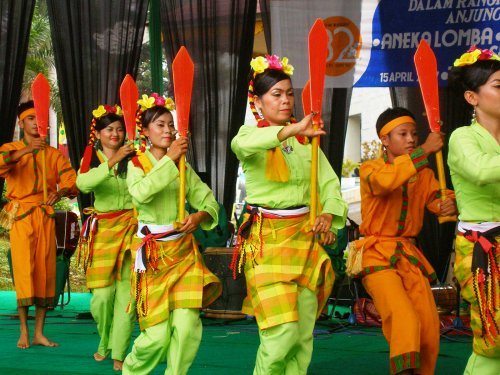
The 2007 Pacu Jalur event – the female (matrilineal) dancer performers braided and waist-tied with Marawa Minangkabau, representing its Minangkabau heritage roots.

Pacu Jalur is a form of traditional Eastern Minangkabau watercraft (usually boat) racing, originated from upper course of the Indragiri River in Eastern-West Sumatran region of Tanah Datar and its surrounding areas (including Kuantan Singingi and Indragiri Hulu – the next door of Tanah Datar, originally part of the native Eastern Minangkabau realm) (Note: nowadays politically annexed by Riau (since 1999), but it did not change the fact about its Minangkabau nativeness) with ancient attested history dates back to the 600s CE (according to Kedukan Bukit Inscription) (Note: it is worth to mention that the large number of envoy of Minangkabau rowers reached the downstream of the Batang Hari River (part of modern-day Jambi provincial region) from its upstream in Minangkabau Highlands (part of modern-day Tanah Datar (West Sumatra) and its surrounding areas in Riau) using watercraft, these specific event described in the Kedukan Bukit Inscription found in Palembang. Inscriptional text: "... maŕlapas dari Mināṅa tāmvan mamāva yaṁ vala dua lakşa daṅan ko śa duaratus cāra di sāmvau ..." Translation: "... went from the Minangkabau carrying twenty thousand reinforcements with two hundreds tributes in the watercraft (boats or canoes) …" — information extracted from the Kedukan Bukit Inscription, a Sumatran ancient inscription dates back to 600s CE) to 1600s CE (based on informations within Tambo Minangkabau manuscript).

=== Mechanism ===
- Involves long wooden boats called jalur (in Minangkabau), up to 25–40 meters long.
- Each boat is manned by up to 60–70 Minangkabau rowers, including a helmsman, drummer, and motivator.
- Held in rivers, especially the Indragiri River.
- Races coincide with national holidays such as Indonesian Independence Day (August) and local cultural Minangkabau festivals.

=== Cultural significance ===
Pacu Jalur historically tied to royal processions and religious ceremonies. It is a symbol of Minangkabau unity, teamwork, and collective strength. Boats are elaborately decorated, with preparation taking months.

== Pacu Jawi ==
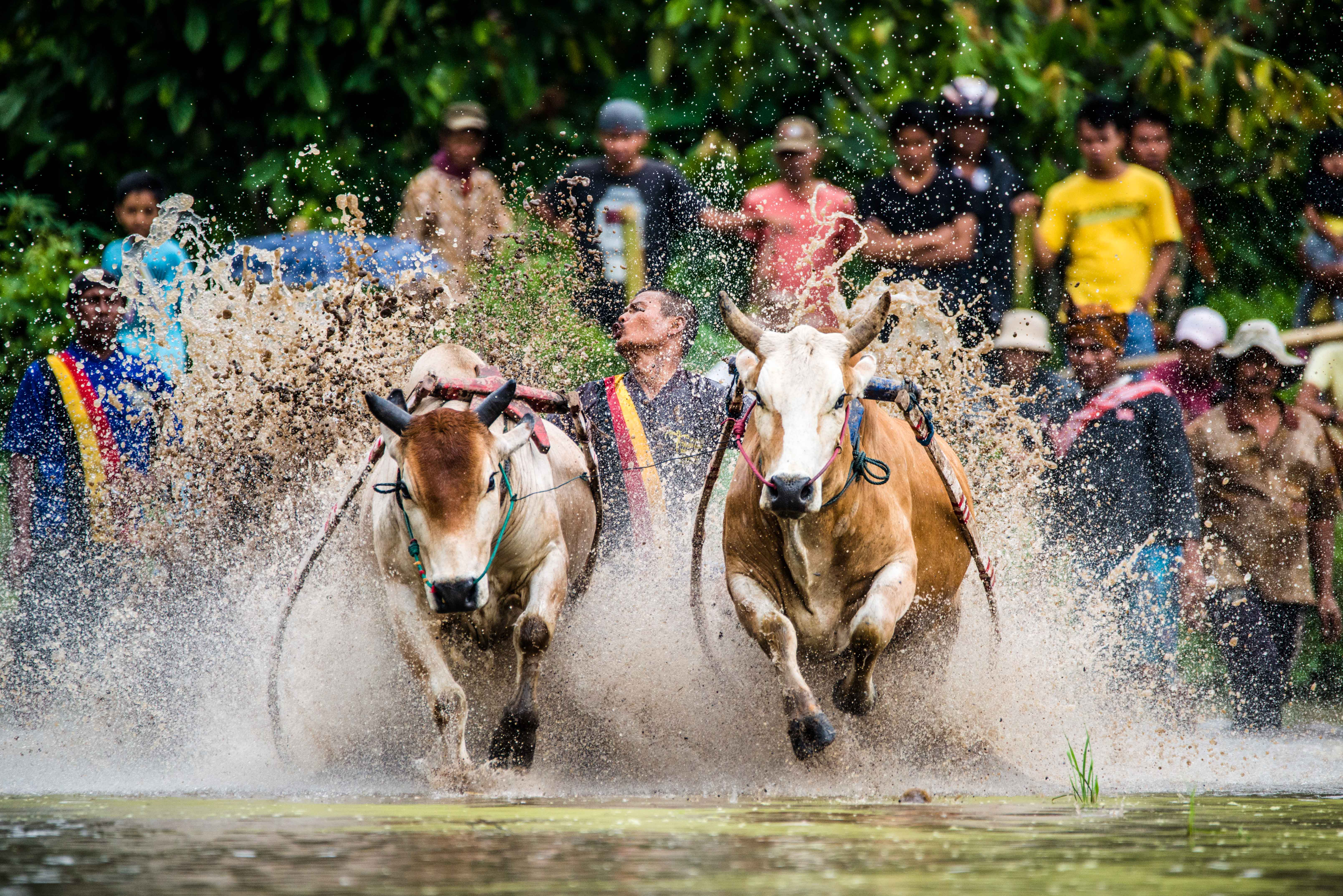
The Pacu Jawi event – the jockey sashed with Marawa Minangkabau, representing its Minangkabau heritage roots.

Pacu Jawi is a traditional Minangkabau bull racing event held in the regencial region of Tanah Datar in West Sumatra, usually in muddy rice fields after harvest. The event is not a competitive race in the modern sense but a ceremonial celebration and demonstration of bull quality, often held in rotation among villages.

=== Mechanism ===
- A jockey rides a pair of bulls by standing on a wooden plow harnessed between them.
- The bulls sprint across a flooded rice field (sawah), and the jockey uses a wooden rein or tail to steer and balance.
- Spectators judge the bulls based on their speed, coordination, and strength, often to determine their value for sale.

=== Cultural significance ===
Tied to agrarian cycles and post-harvest rituals, Pacu Jawi serves both as entertainment and a market for bull trade. It is associated with the resilience and strength of rural Minangkabau Highlands life.

== Pacu Kudo ==
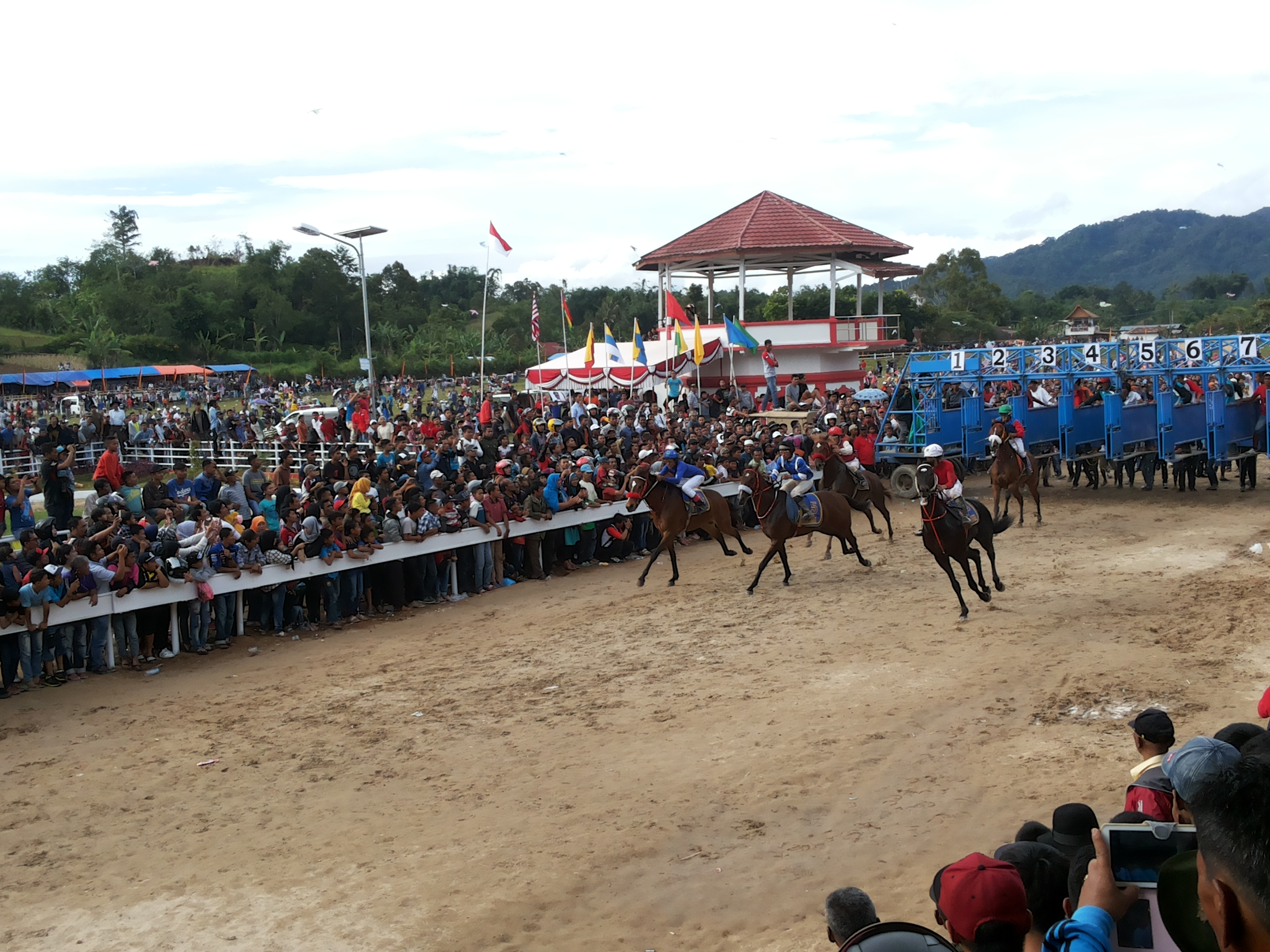
The 2016 Pacu Kudo event in Bukittinggi, West Sumatra.

Pacu Kudo (or colloquially also known as Pacu Bugih) is a traditional Minangkabau horse racing native to several Minangkabau Highland regions of West Sumatra, notably in Tanah Datar, Agam, and Padang Panjang. Unlike other Pacu races that are rooted in agricultural cycles, Pacu Kudo reflects Minangkabau society's historical equine culture and nobility traditions.

=== Mechanism ===
- The races are held on grass tracks, typically 800–1000 meters long.
- Participants range from young Minangkabau amateur jockeys to seasoned professionals.
- Horses are of local or mixed breed, often trained in Minangkabau villages.
- Events are accompanied by cultural Minangkabau festivities, including traditional Minangkabau music, food, and performances.

=== Cultural significance ===
Horses have long symbolized prestige, power, and status among Minangkabau elites. Pacu Kudo events are held during nagari (lit. 'communal Minangkabau village') festivals or to mark significant public holidays. The sport fosters regional pride and is a major event in Padang Panjang's annual calendar. It also plays a role in youth Minangkabau development, where Minangkabau boys are trained to ride and care for horses as a rite of passage.
