= Horse racing in Indonesia =

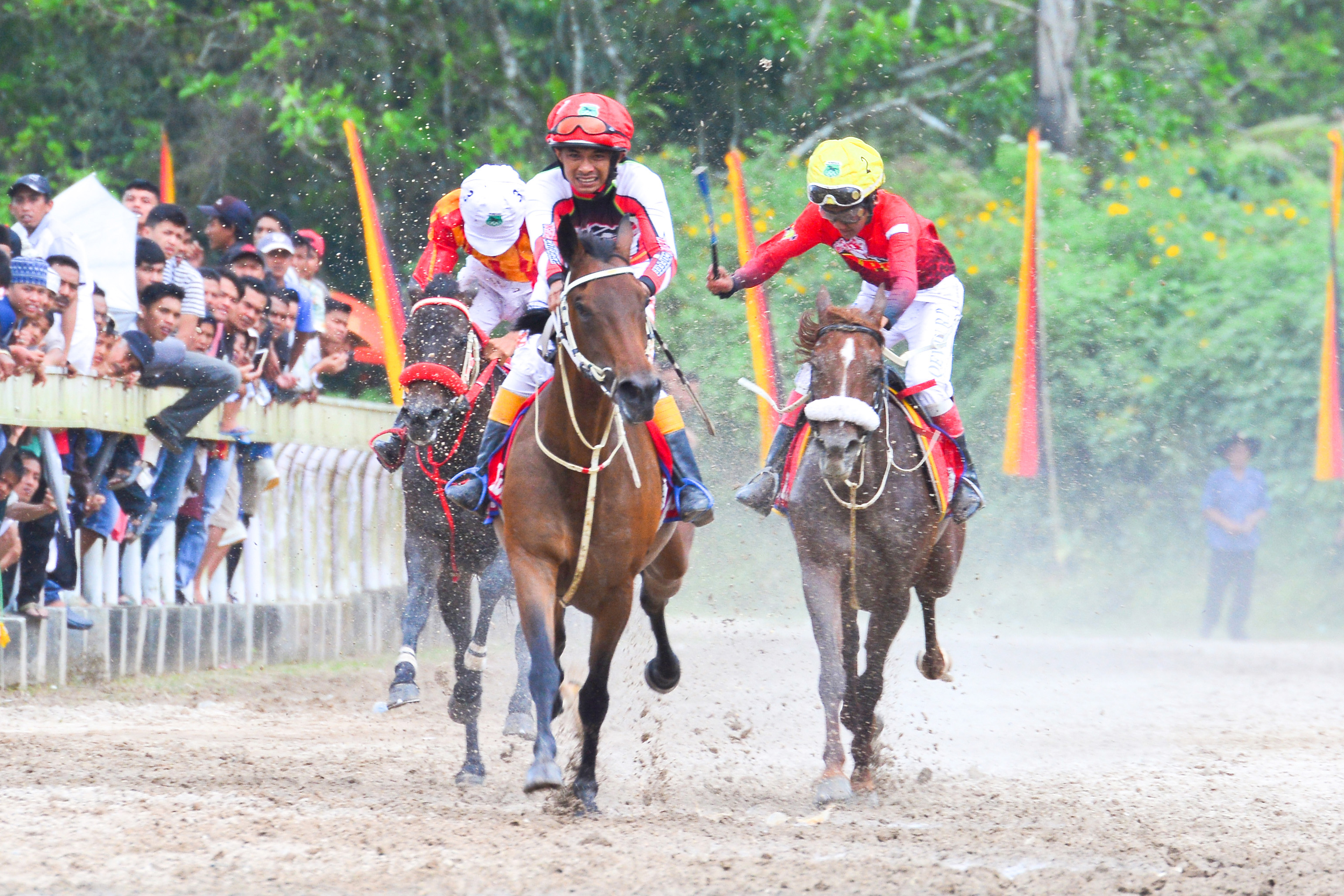
- Horseracing in Bukittinggi, West Sumatra, 2019
- Governing body: Equestrian Association of Indonesia (through Pordasi Pacu)
- First played: Earliest record in 1812

National competitions
- Indonesia's Horse Racing (series); Kejurnas Pacuan Kuda PORDASI; Indonesia Derby; Horse racing in Pekan Olahraga Nasional

Horse racing in Indonesia is a form of equestrian sport steeped in Indonesian history and culture. The history of the sport in the region can be dated back to the colonial area of the Dutch East Indies. After independence, there were many attempts to standardize the sport under one organization. In the 1960s, it was agreed that Equestrian Association of Indonesia (PORDASI) would become the official governing body for horse racing and other equestrian sports in Indonesia.

The sport saw its peak during the New Order era with the development of major modern venues such as Pulomas. Despite a decline in popularity following the nationwide gambling ban, recent efforts have been initiated to professionalize and revive the sport.

Horse racing in the country is primarily flat racing, with major events such as the annual Triple Crown and Kejuaraan Nasional Pacuan Kuda (National Horse Racing Championship) series, which are, since the 2020s, scheduled into the Indonesia's Horse Racing series. Uniquely, Indonesian flat horse racing consists of three different types: Thoroughbred, horses crossbred with Thoroughbreds, and Kuda Pacu Indonesia.

== History ==
=== Colonial era ===
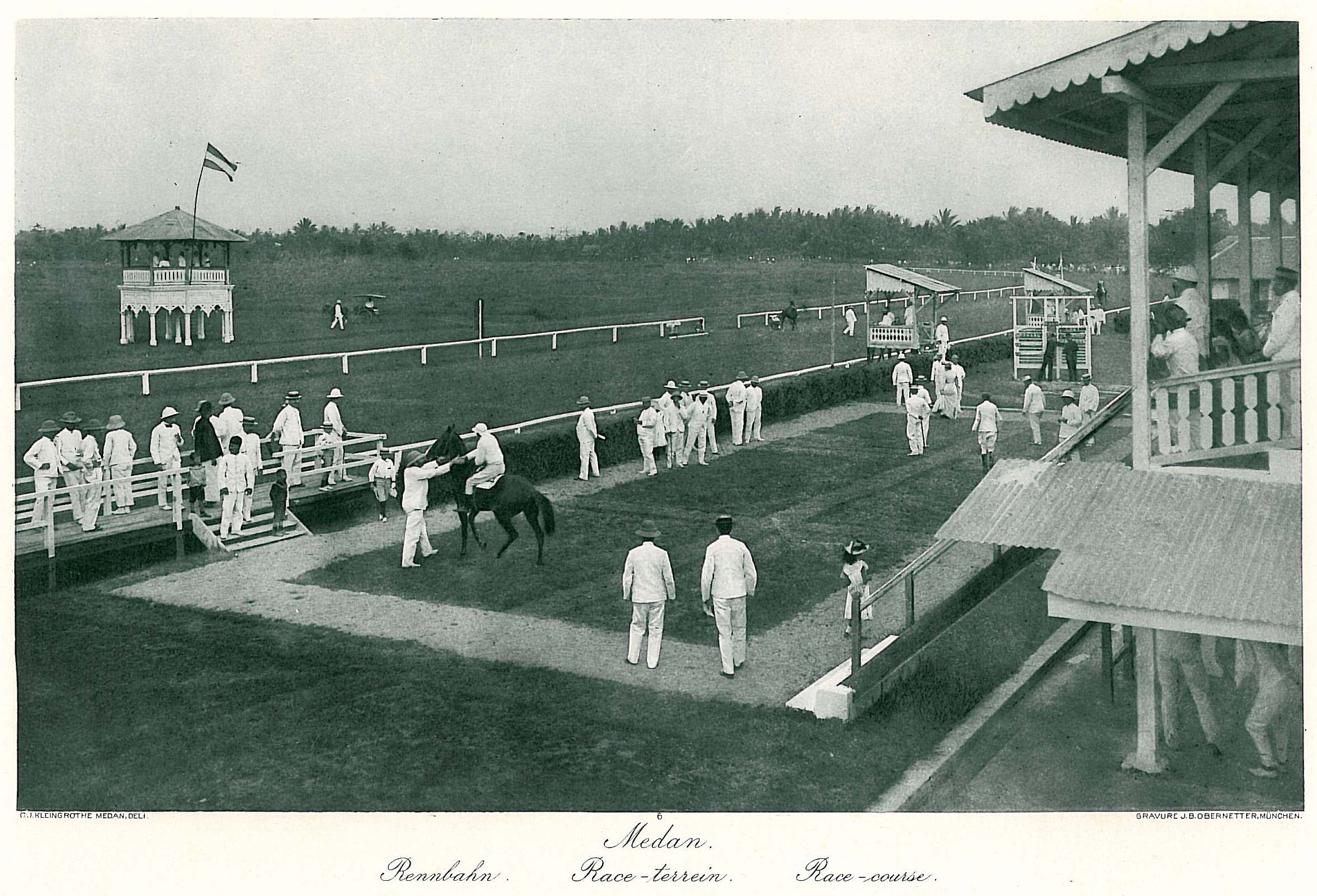
Turf racecourse in Medan, c. 1900

Most of the known history of horse racing in Indonesia comes from the Dutch East Indies colonial period. The earliest record of modern horse racing was reported during the British interregnum in 1812, as a form of recreation for colonial officials, nobility, and the elite. Over time, it has been adapted and integrated into local traditions across the archipelago, such as in Bima (known as pacoa jara), Sumbawa (known as maen jaran), Aceh (known as pacu kude), West Sumatra (known as pacu kudo for flat horse racing and draf bogie for carriage driving), and North Sulawesi.

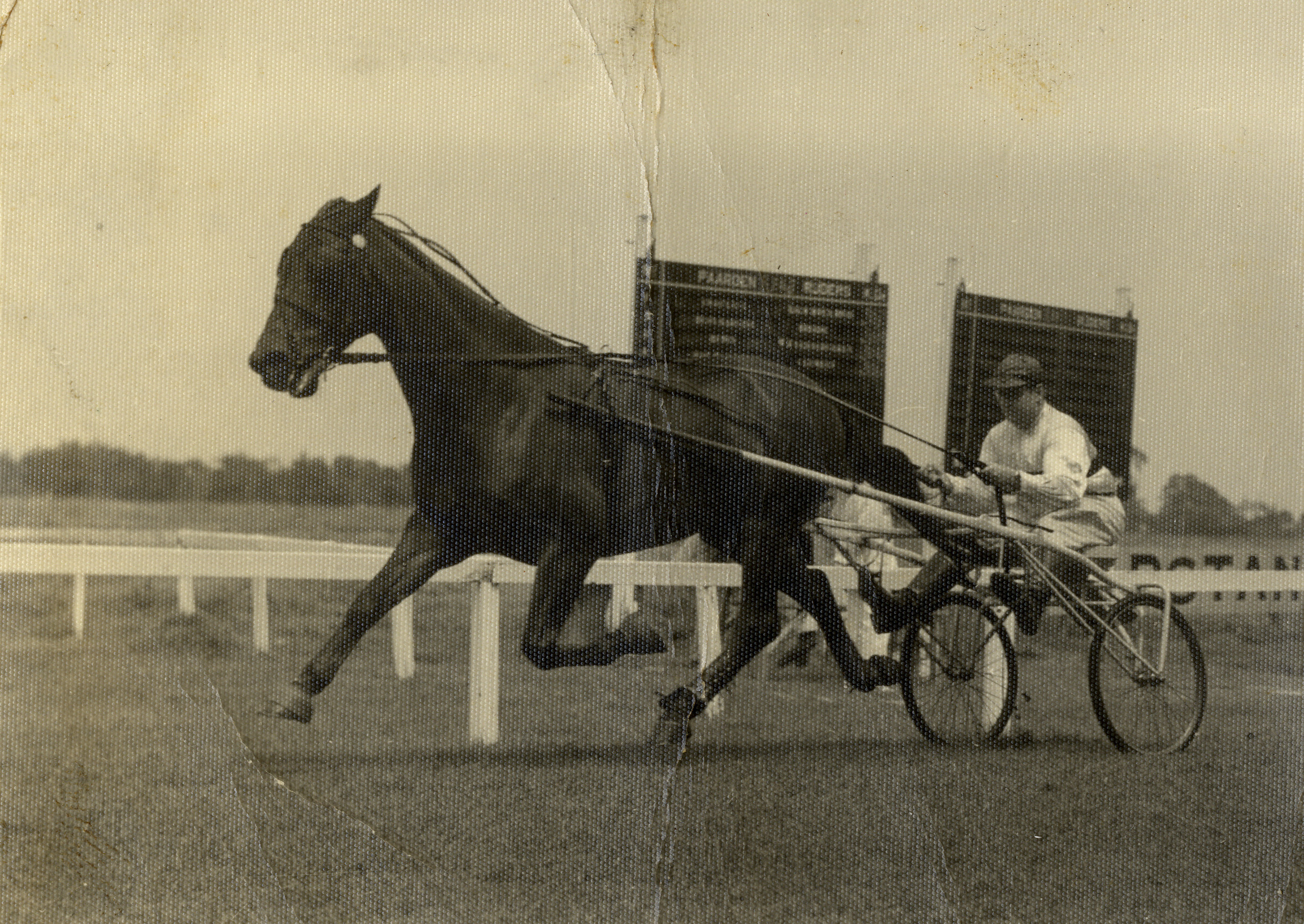
Harness racing, 1930s

Horse racing in Java during the period was governed by the Javan Horse and Harness Racing Association (De Javasche Ren- en Harddraverij Vereeniging). Several regional organizations also operated, including the Batavia–Buitenzorg Racing Club (Batavia–Buitenzorg Wedloop Sociëteit), the Semarang Horseracing Society (Wedloop Sociëteit Semarang), the Priangan Horseracing Club (Preanger Wedloop Sociëteit), the Surabaya Harness and Flat Horse Racing Association (Soerabaijasche Harddraverij en Renvereeniging), and the Deli Racing Association (De Deli Renvereeniging). The common horse breeds used during this era included imported Australian or English thoroughbreds, Arabians, ponies, and local horses specific to each region (e.g. Preanger horse or Sandalwood pony), as well as crossbreeds.

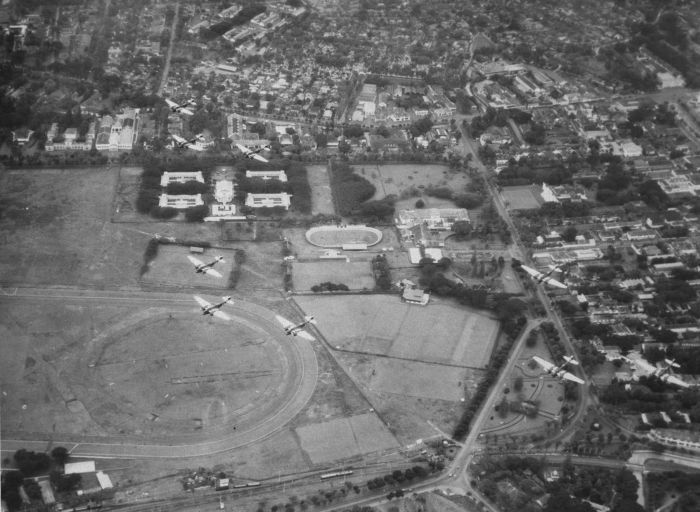
Aerial picture of the Koningsplein (now Medan Merdeka), circa 1933. On the bottom left corner is a racecourse.

Many racecourses of the colonial era have fallen into disuse, with some being repurposed for other public usage. Examples include the racecourse in Koningsplein which is now a part of Merdeka Square, and a racecourse in Tegallega, Bandung which is now Tegallega Square that houses the monument commemorating the event of Bandung Sea of Fire. Notable exceptions include Bukit Ambacang Racecourse in Bukittinggi, built in 1889 and considered the oldest racecourse in the country, and Bancah Laweh Racecourse in Padang Panjang, established in 1913. Both racecourses became cultural references in Indonesian literature during the Balai Pustaka era, contributing to the narrative settings of novels that depict Minangkabau culture, such as Hamka's 1939 novel Tenggelamnya Kapal van der Wijck and Tulis Sutan Sati's 1928 novel Sengsara Membawa Nikmat.

Following the Dutch East Indies campaign by Imperial Japan in March 1942, the horse racing scene came to a halt. During the time, horses were primarily used for military purposes and helping war efforts until after the transfer of sovereignty to Indonesia in 1949.

=== Post-colonial era ===
Horse racing enthusiasts in Indonesia took the initiative to revive the sport after its hiatus during World War II. The return of colonial horse racing in the newly born country of Indonesia began with the reopening of the Tegallega racecourse in Bandung in 1948 after repairs following damage during the Japanese occupation. In addition to the opening ceremony of the racetrack, the event also marked the reactivation of the Preanger Wedloop Sociëteit (later renamed Perkumpulan Pacuan Kuda Priangan), which had been dormant during the Japanese occupation. Other organizations such as the Batavia–Buitenzorg Wedloop Sociëteit (later renamed Perkumpulan Pacuan Kuda Djakarta-Bogor) follow suit in their reopening the next year.

Although horse racing organizations existed before independence, they did not yet operate on a national scale and were largely regional in nature. Efforts to unite these associations resulted in the formation of the Indonesian Horse Racing Association (Pusat Organisasi Poni Seluruh Indonesia, POPSI) around 1953, led by Lieutenant Colonel Singgih. Unfortunately, POPSI failed to develop and faded over time.

=== New Order era ===
During the transition to the New Order in 1966, an exhibition race was held in Bandung on June 9. This culminated in a meeting on June 11–12, which formally established the Equestrian Association of Indonesia (PORDASI), with Achmad Sham as its general chairman. Few months later, the newly formed organization requested then-General Suharto to serve as the “godfather of Indonesian horse racing” and to permit the use of his name for the upcoming national championship. His approval was formalized through the Surat Keputusan Direktur Jenderal Olahraga No. 016/1966, dated October 28, 1966, which officially recognized PORDASI as the national governing body for equestrian sports in Indonesia. Suharto’s horse, Diana, won the inaugural Soeharto Cup held in Bogor on November 12–13, 1966.

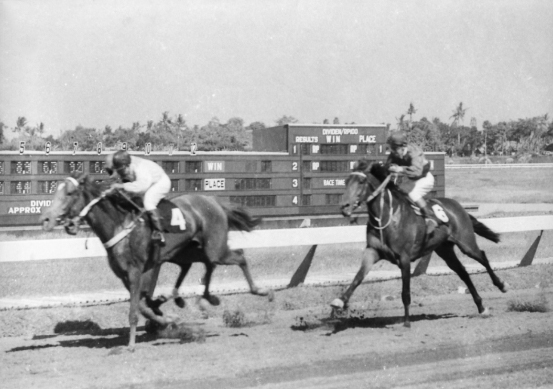
Pulomas Racecourse in 1971

In 1971, the Pulomas Racecourse was built in East Jakarta, inaugurated by then-Governor Ali Sadikin. This racecourse was developed and financed by Djakarta Racing Management, a joint venture between the Jakarta provincial government and a private Australian consortium. The racecourse's construction and operation also received support from notable figures, such as retired military officer and founder of Kopassus, Alex Kawilarang and renowned Australian racehorse trainer Bart Cummings. This racecourse also introduced the totalizator system for wagering, which was legalized in Jakarta until a nationwide gambling ban was enacted in 1981.

During this time, the horses being raced ranged from full thoroughbreds (some of which were imports from Australia), local horses (colloquially known as sandels (Note: Referring to Sandalwood pony, although not all local horses are of this breed.)), or crossbreeds. This era also introduced a new classification system for crossbred horses, known locally as G horses (kuda G), where G1 referred to the first generation of crossbreeds, G2 to the second generation (crossed again with a thoroughbred), and so forth.

This era saw the first ever winner of the Indonesian Triple Crown, Mystere, in 1978. However, the title's designation was discontinued not long after in 1979.

=== Reformasi era ===
During this time, a new term designated for crossbred horses called Kuda Pacu Indonesia was created, defined as a cross between G3 and/or G4 horses with another G3 and/or G4 horse or a Thoroughbred.

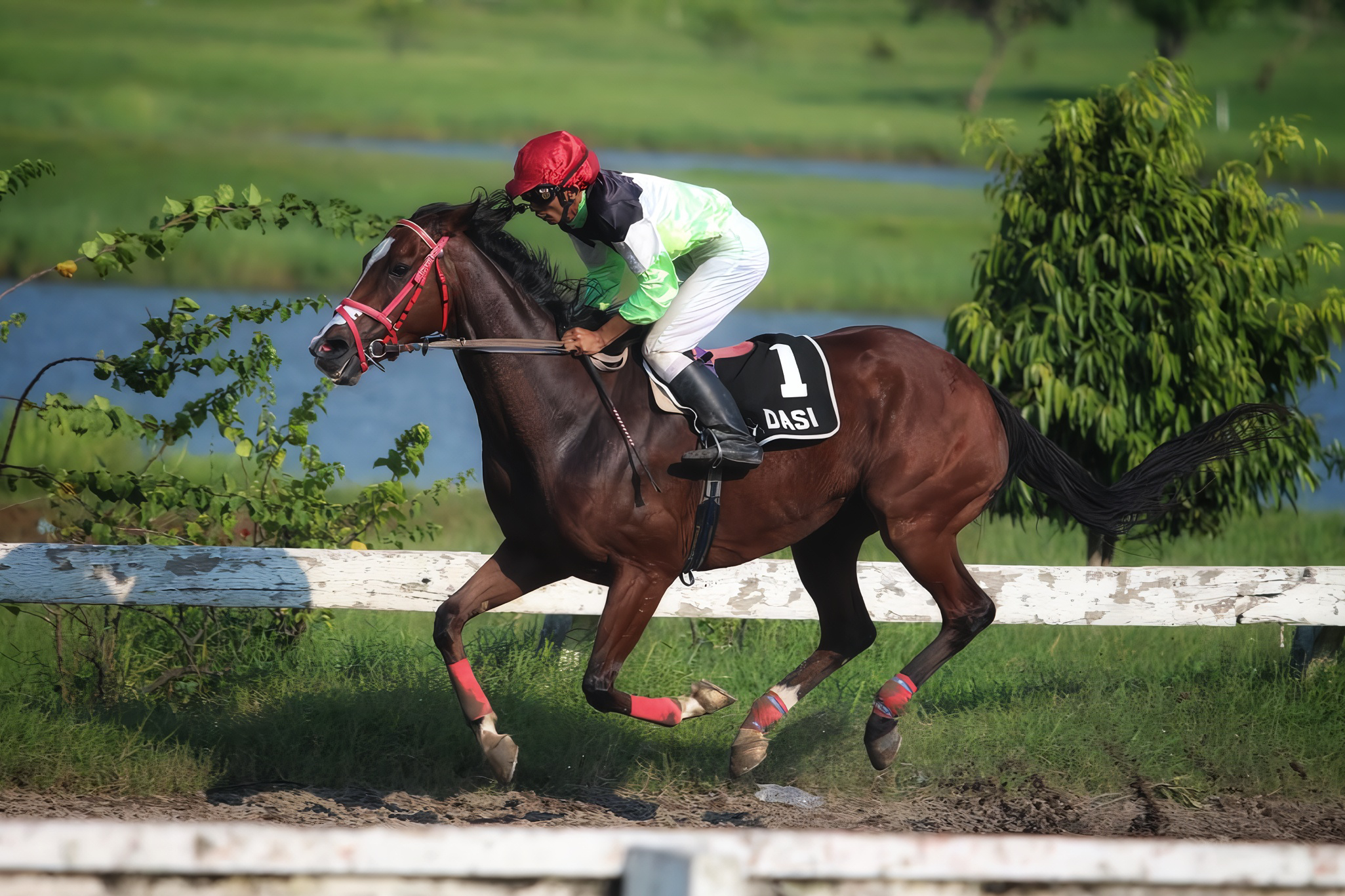
Photo of Djohar Manik in 2016

Manik Trisula became the second horse and the first filly to win the Indonesian Triple Crown in 2002, marking the end of a 25-year hiatus in the series. Following this, Djohar Manik followed suit, becoming the third horse to achieve the title in 2014.

Since the fall of Suharto, the popularity of horse racing in Indonesia plummeted. In 2016, Pulomas Racecourse shut down its operation to make way for the new construction of Jakarta International Equestrian Park, which was completed in preparation for the 2018 Asian Games.

In anticipation for the 2016 Pekan Olahraga Nasional, a racecourse in Pangandaran Regency, West Java was upgraded to fulfill national standard and was finished by August 2016.

==== 2020s ====
Amidst the COVID-19 pandemic, horse racing in Indonesia continued, with major races like the A.E. Kawilarang Memorial Cup, the first leg of the Kejurnas series, and various regional races being held.

Efforts to revive the sport emerged again in the 2020s, with promoter SARGA.CO launching national racing circuits in collaboration with PORDASI to professionalize horse racing and attract younger audiences. These racing circuits are formally structured into the Indonesia's Horse Racing series.

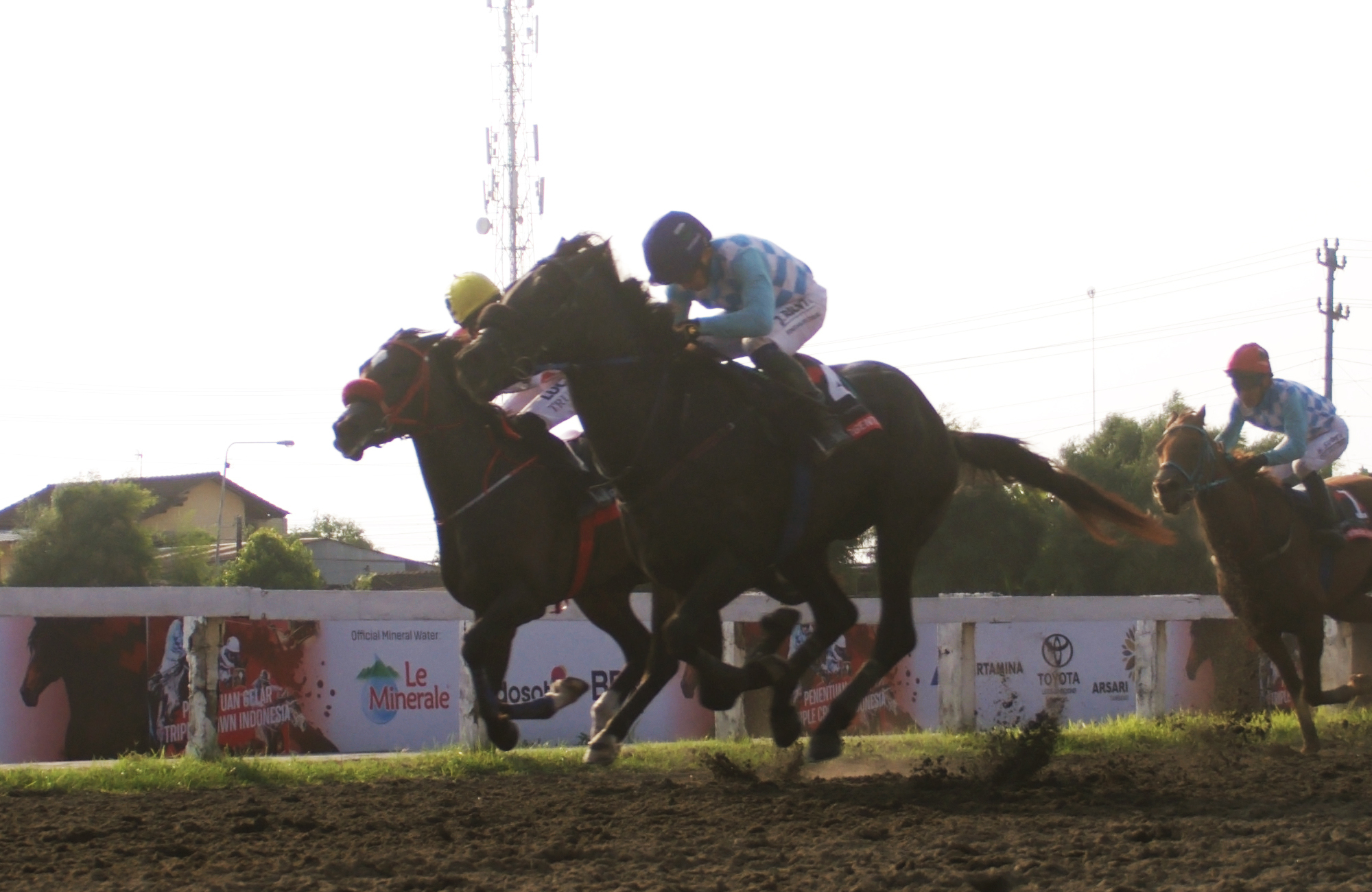
King Argentin (number 4, checkered light blue-white silks) in the 2025 Indonesia Derby

The global release of Umamusume: Pretty Derby in June 2025 unexpectedly became a catalyst for the revival of horse racing scene in Indonesia among young people. The promoter SARGA.CO, which organizes national horse racing events, acknowledged the franchise’s influence and has since partnered with several local Umamusume fan communities to promote the sport. Coincidentally, on July 27, King Argentin achieved a historic milestone by winning all three legs of the Indonesian Triple Crown, becoming the fourth horse to accomplish the feat after an 11-year absence of a winner.

Following an incident at the 2025 Jateng Derby, PORDASI enacted a new rule stating that jockeys are now only allowed to ride a maximum of six horses in one event. Prior to this rule's enactment, jockeys were able to ride an indefinite amount of horses in a single event, with some participating in ten to eleven races.

In May 2025, The Indonesian Equestrian Association (PP Pordasi) officially signed a strategic partnership agreement with France. The cooperation agreement includes a strategic partnership with French Equestrian Federation (FFE), France Galop, Association Of Racing Stables (AFASEC), French Horse and Riding Institute (IFCE) and Filière Cheval which is a follow-up to the visit of PP Pordasi to France on March 6–9, 2025. The strategic partnership agreement was signed by Chairman of PP Pordasi Aryo Djojohadikusumo and Director General of IFCE Jean-Roch Gaillet at the State Palace, witnessed by President Prabowo Subianto and Emmanuel Macron. In the case of horse racing specifically, the partnership aims to improve the standards of the races in Indonesia. These efforts include jockey training, venue construction, and a training facility in Indonesia.

In December 2025, Aryo Djojohadikusumo along with Sarga Group CEO Aseanto Oudang held a meeting with the Chairman of Dubai Racing Club, Sheikh Rashed bin Dalmook Al Maktoum, at Meydan Racecourse, Dubai, United Arab Emirates, to discuss avenues of collaboration. The details of both collaborations are yet to be released.

== Horse classifications ==
=== Based on age ===
For classifications based on age, classes are divided into groups for horses aged two, three, and four years and older, with all groups including both stallion and fillies. Horses aged 2 to 3 years begin their racing careers in the Pemula or Perdana Class (beginner/maiden). Three-year-old horses are classified under the Remaja (junior) or Derby Class, and this is the only age group eligible to compete for the Indonesian Triple Crown. Meanwhile, horses aged 3 years and above can compete in the Dewasa (adult) Class, and horses aged four years and older are allowed to participate in open races covering both long and/or sprint distances.

=== Based on height ===
Kejurnas Classifications		Non-Kejurnas Classifications	
Class	Height (cm)	Class	Height (cm)
A	≥ 161,1	G	134,1 – 138
B	156,1 – 161	H	130,1 – 134
C	151,1 – 156	I	127,1 – 130
D	146,1 – 151	J	124,1 – 127
E	142,1 – 146		
F	138,1 – 142		

Height classifications are based on the horse's height without considering age. In other words, horses of any age group, from two years old and up, can compete as long as they meet the established height standards and requirements. This classification does not apply to Thoroughbred horses.

Below are classifications based on horse height. Races in classes A through F are categorized as national championships (Kejurnas). Meanwhile, races in classes G through J are not included in the national championship category (non-Kejurnas).

=== Based on Thoroughbred blood percentage ===
As most Indonesian race horses are crossbreeds between Thoroughbreds and locals, they are classified according to their Thoroughbred blood percentage, a system commonly referred to as the G-horse grading. This is done to ensure that bloodlines can be tracked for breeding and selection.

The classification begins with G1, representing first-generation crossbreeds between local horses (also known in this classification as G0/sandel/LK) and Thoroughbreds (also known as THB). In Mendelian terms, each generation doubles the proportion of Thoroughbred genetic material, resulting in 50% (G1), 75% (G2), 87.5% (G3), and so forth. Horses beyond the 4th generation are commonly referred to using "KP", which progresses through KP5, KP6, KP7, and so on.

In 1996, a new alternative designation for crossbred racehorses known as Kuda Pacu Indonesia was standardized. This generation of horses are defined as crosses between third-generation (G3) and fourth-generation (G4) breeds. This classification was officially launched by the Ministry of Agriculture in 2013.

In 2021, a new classification for crossbreeds was put forward and decided on by PORDASI. This new classification, known as Gumarang, is defined as the result of crossing two KP5–KP8 horses, and later, crossing of the resulting offspring. Though already ratified by PORDASI, the classification has yet to be officially launched.

Breed	Cross	THB blood percentage
Thoroughbred		100%
Local horse (G0/Sandel)		0%
G1	F_{1}-generation cross	50%
G2	F_{2}-generation cross	75%
G3	F_{3}-generation cross	87.5%
G4	F_{4}-generation cross	93.75%
KP5	F_{5}-generation cross	96.88%
KP6	F_{6}-generation cross	98.44%
KP7	F_{7}-generation cross	99.21%
KP8	F_{8}-generation cross	99.61%
Kuda Pacu Indonesia	G3×G3, G4×G4, or G3×G4	~87.5–93.75%

== Jockeys ==
PORDASI, Indonesia's equestrian authority, mandates specific standards for professional horse racing jockeys under its official championship guidelines. To qualify, prospective jockeys must be Indonesian citizens aged 18 or older and selected by a horse trainer. Licensing requires passing a medical exam (both physical and mental) and a skills assessment by the Board of Stewards, alongside a formal recommendation from the provincial PORDASI chapter. Jockeys racing small horses must weigh at least 35 kg, while those riding national standard horses must maintain a weight between 48 kg and 55 kg.

One of Indonesia's top jockeys is Coen Singal. He began his career as a jockey in the 1980s, and since then, he has won the Indonesia Derby five times (1988, 1990, 1999, 2000, and 2004). Besides Coen, Jemmy Runtu has also won five Indonesia Derby races (2016, 2018, 2021, 2024, and 2025). Runtu is the jockey for King Argentin, the winner of the 2025 Indonesian Triple Crown.

== Races ==
=== Handicaps ===
The Kejurnas series uses a system similar to the Weight for Age system, where the handicap assigned to each horse depends on its age, sex, and height within the height classification. As a rule of thumb, for each centimetre above the class' minimum height or age above 2yo, a horse is assigned an extra 0.5kg to their weight, up to 2kg for a horse's age. Class A horses also have a maximum of 2kg handicap for their height. This is in addition to the base weight which depends on class and sex. Class A and B horses carry a baseline 51kg handicap, while C through F horses carry a 50kg baseline handicap. Mares and fillies also receive a 1kg allowance.

=== Indonesian classic races ===
These are a series of flat horse races. Each classic is run once each year and is a part of PORDASI's national calendar.

Race	Date	Distance	Series
Triple Crown Series 1	March / April	1200 meters	Triple Crown
Pertiwi Cup	March / April	1600 meters	Kejurnas Series 1 (for 3-years old fillies)
Triple Crown Series 2	May	1600 meters	Triple Crown
Indonesia Derby	July	2000 meters	Triple Crown/Kejurnas Series 1
Super Sprints	October	1300 meters	Kejurnas Series 2
Star of Stars	October	2200 meters	Kejurnas Series 2

==== Kejurnas Series ====
Once a year, PORDASI organizes the National Horse Racing Championship (Indonesian: Kejuaraan Nasional Pacuan Kuda, also abbreviated as Kejurnas), in which participants compete not as individuals but as representatives of their specific provincial or regional branches. The overall champion is determined by the total points earned across all racing classes. The National Horse Racing Championship is held to compete for the President’s Cup (Piala Presiden).

===== Kejurnas Series 1 =====
Also known as the Triple Crown Series or Tiga Mahkota Series. Indonesian horses, both colts and fillies, obtain the Triple Crown title by winning all three legs. This series consists of:

- Triple Crown Series 1, Dirt 1200m
- Triple Crown Series 2, Dirt 1600m
- Indonesia Derby, Dirt 2000m

This Kejurnas series contests racehorses based on their age divided by class. The Indonesia Derby is regarded as one of the main events within the first Kejurnas series, as it is traditionally held on the same day and integrated into the championship program.

===== Kejurnas Series 2 =====
This Kejurnas series contests racehorses based on their height divided by class. The main race of this series include:

- Super Sprints, Dirt 1300m
- Star of Stars, Dirt 2200m

=== Other major races ===
Other major races include:

- A.E. Kawilarang Memorial Cup
- Jateng Derby
- Piala Ketua Umum Pengurus Pusat Pordasi (Piala Ketum PP Pordasi)
- Piala Raja Hamengku Buwono XI
- Pakualam Cup
- Sumpah Pemuda Cup

Regional horse racing series include:

- Sawahlunto Derby
- Wisata Derby Bukittinggi
- Various races held by mayors/regents (e.g. Piala Bupati Minut, etc.)

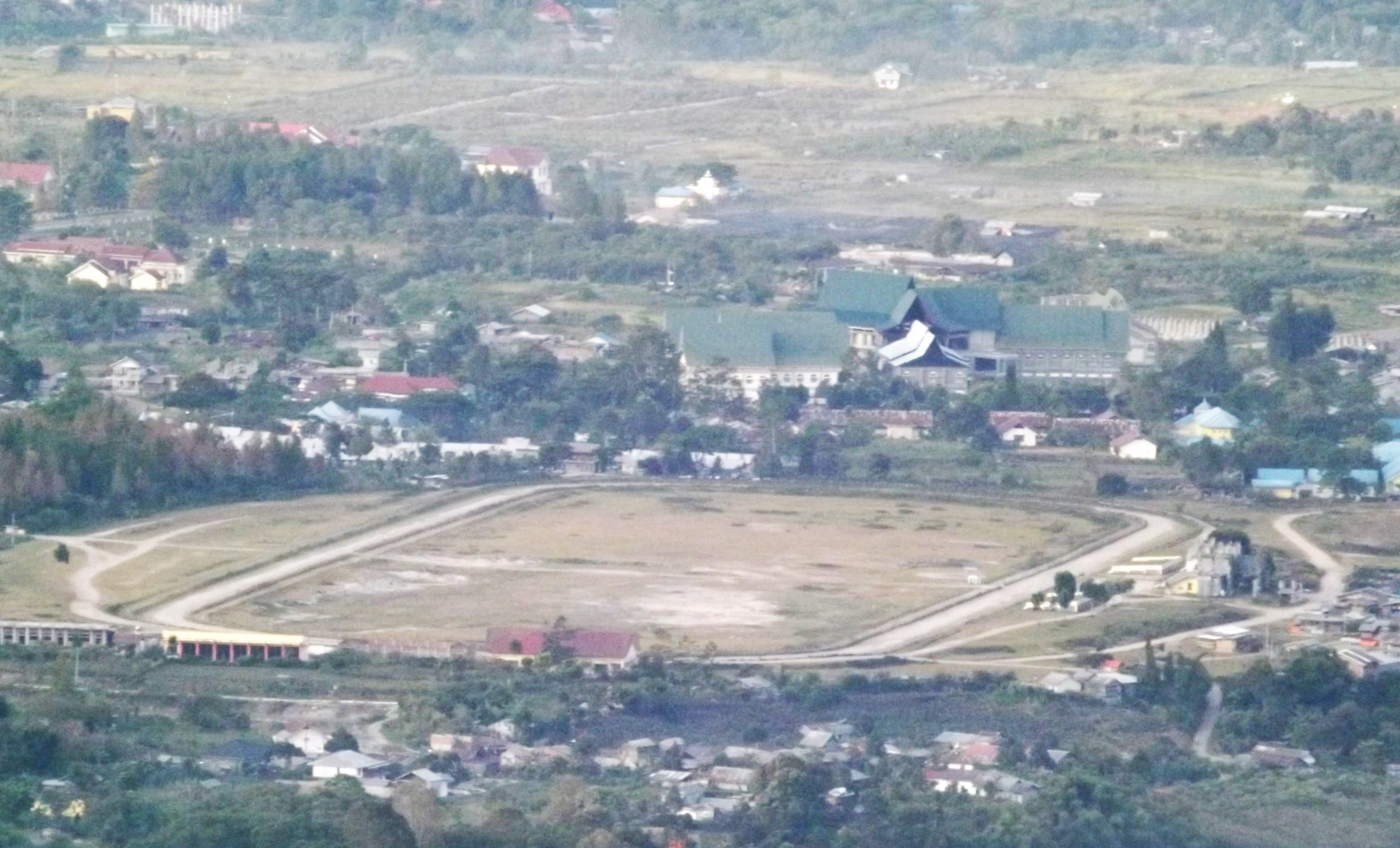
Takengon Racecourse in 2019. This racecourse became the venue for horseracing in 2024 Pekan Olahraga Nasional

Outside of national competitions organized by PORDASI, regional branches and local administrators also hold their own horse racing events, ranging from modern flat races to traditional forms of competition). Horse racing is also commonly contested at the Pekan Olahraga Nasional, its most recent inclusion being at the 2024 edition.

=== Non-flat and/or traditional/local races ===
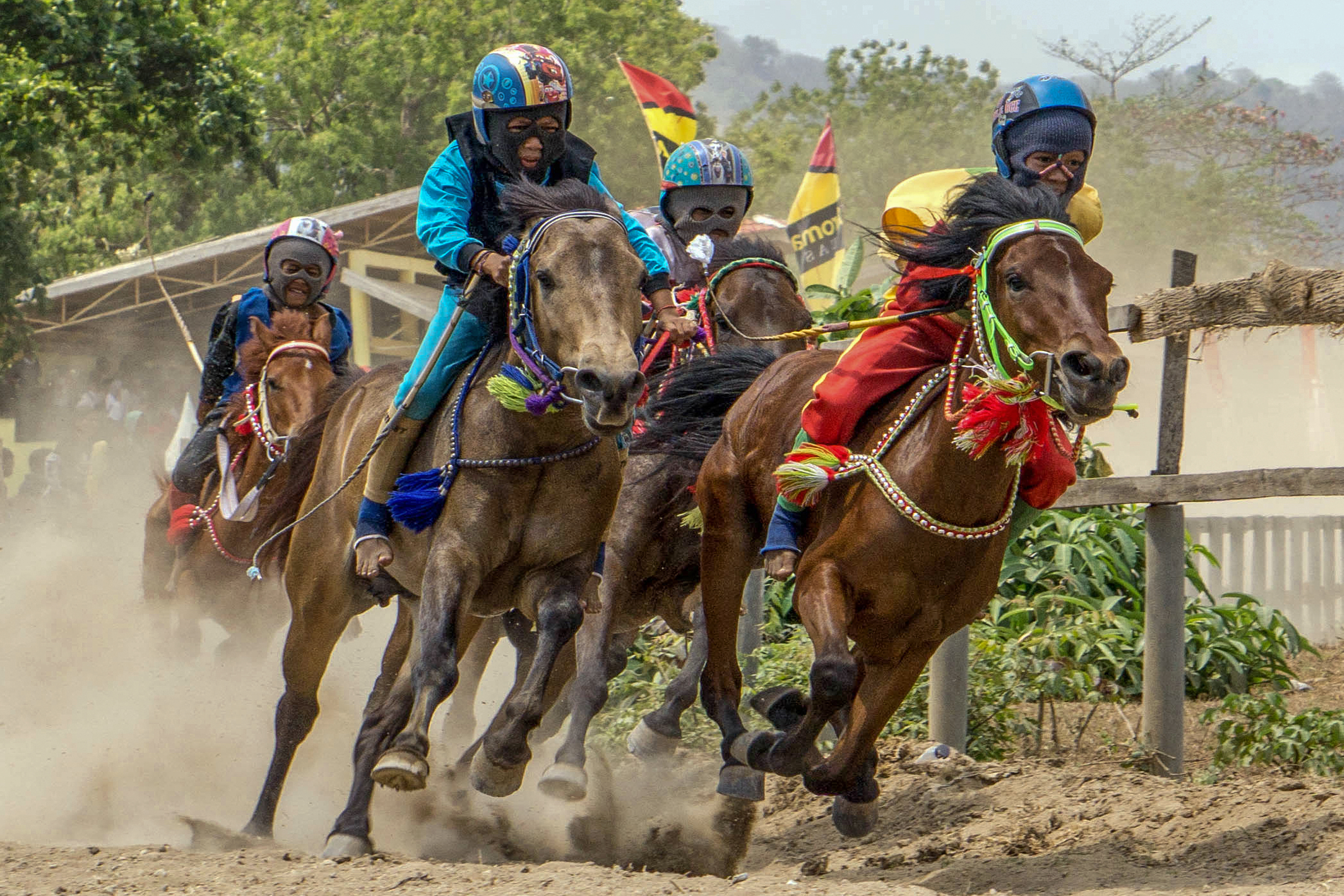
Traditional pacoa jara race in Bima. Jockeys in these races are usually children.

Horse racing has been incorporated into local traditions since it was first brought across the archipelago. Each adaptations and its variation exist, spanning from Aceh, West Sumatra, Bima (West Nusa Tenggara), Sumbawa (East Nusa Tenggara), and North Sulawesi. Traditions in Aceh (pacu kude) and Bima (pacoa jara) were recognized as part of the National Intangible Cultural Heritage of Indonesia in 2016.

Aside from flat races, both in traditional and modern sense, other forms of horse racing (mainly harness racing) exists within local Indonesian horse racing scene. In traditional Minangkabau horse racing, aside from pacu kudo, another common equestrian competition is called draf bogie. In draf bogie, the winner is determined not only by which horse crosses the finish line first, but also by the quality and consistency of its gait. In North Sulawesi, harness racing is commonly known as bendi kalaper.

== Venues ==
Most horse racing tracks in Indonesia are dirt tracks, apart from Yosonegoro Racecourse in Gorontalo, which is the only turf track in the country.

Venue	Location	Track	Status	Have hosted national-level race(s) (Note: Including extra-Pordasi races like Pekan Olahraga Nasional.)
Arcamanik Racecourse	Bandung, West Java	Dirt	Defunct since 2013	Yes
Balitka Racecourse	Manado, North Sulawesi	Dirt	Active	Regional
Bancah Laweh Racecourse	Padang Panjang, West Sumatra	Dirt	Active	Regional
Bukit Ambacang Racecourse	Bukittinggi, West Sumatra	Dirt (Note: Initially turf.)	Active	Regional
Bora Racecourse	Sigi Regency, Central Sulawesi	Dirt	Active	Regional
Cilembang Racecourse	Tasikmalaya, West Java	Dirt	Active	Regional
Dadaha Racecourse	Tasikmalaya, West Java	Dirt	Defunct since 1980	Regional
HM Hasan Gayo Racecourse	Takengon, Aceh	Dirt	Active	Yes
Kandih Racecourse	Sawahlunto, West Sumatra	Dirt	Active	Yes
Ki Ageng Astrojoyo Racecourse	Pasuruan, East Java	Dirt	Active	Yes
Kubu Gadang Racecourse	Payakumbuh, West Sumatra	Dirt	Active	Yes
Legokjawa Racecourse	Pangandaran, West Java	Dirt	Active	Yes
Lembah Kara Racecourse	Dompu Regency, East Nusa Tenggara	Dirt	Active	Regional
Maesa Tompaso Racecourse	Tompaso, North Sulawesi	Dirt	Active	Yes
Nyi Ageng Serang Racecourse	Sragen, Central Java	Dirt	Defunct since 2010	Regional
Pada Eweta Racecourse	Waikabubak, East Nusa Tenggara	Dirt	Active	Regional
Pulomas Racecourse	East Jakarta	Dirt	Defunct since 2016	Yes
Ranomuut Racecourse	Manado, North Sulawesi	Dirt	Defunct since before 2003	Yes
Rihi Eti Racecourse	Waingapu, East Nusa Tenggara	Dirt	Active	Regional
Sultan Agung Racecourse	Bantul, DIY	Dirt	Active	Yes
Siborongborong Racecourse	North Tapanuli Regency, North Sumatra	Turf (Note: Non-standard turf, this racecourse not using standard turf for horse racing.)	Active	Regional
Tanah Sareal Racecourse	Bogor, West Java	Turf	Defunct since 1967	Yes
Tegallega Racecourse	Bandung, West Java	Turf	Defunct since 1968	Yes
Tegalwaton Racecourse	Semarang Regency, Central Java	Dirt	Active	Yes
Tunggul Hitam Racecourse	Padang, West Sumatra	Dirt	Active	Yes
Yosonegoro Racecourse	Gorontalo Regency, Gorontalo	Turf	Active	Regional
