= Bukit Ambacang Racecourse =

Horse racing venue in West Sumatra

Bukit Ambacang Racecourse Gelanggang Bukit Ambacang Galanggang Bukik Ambacang
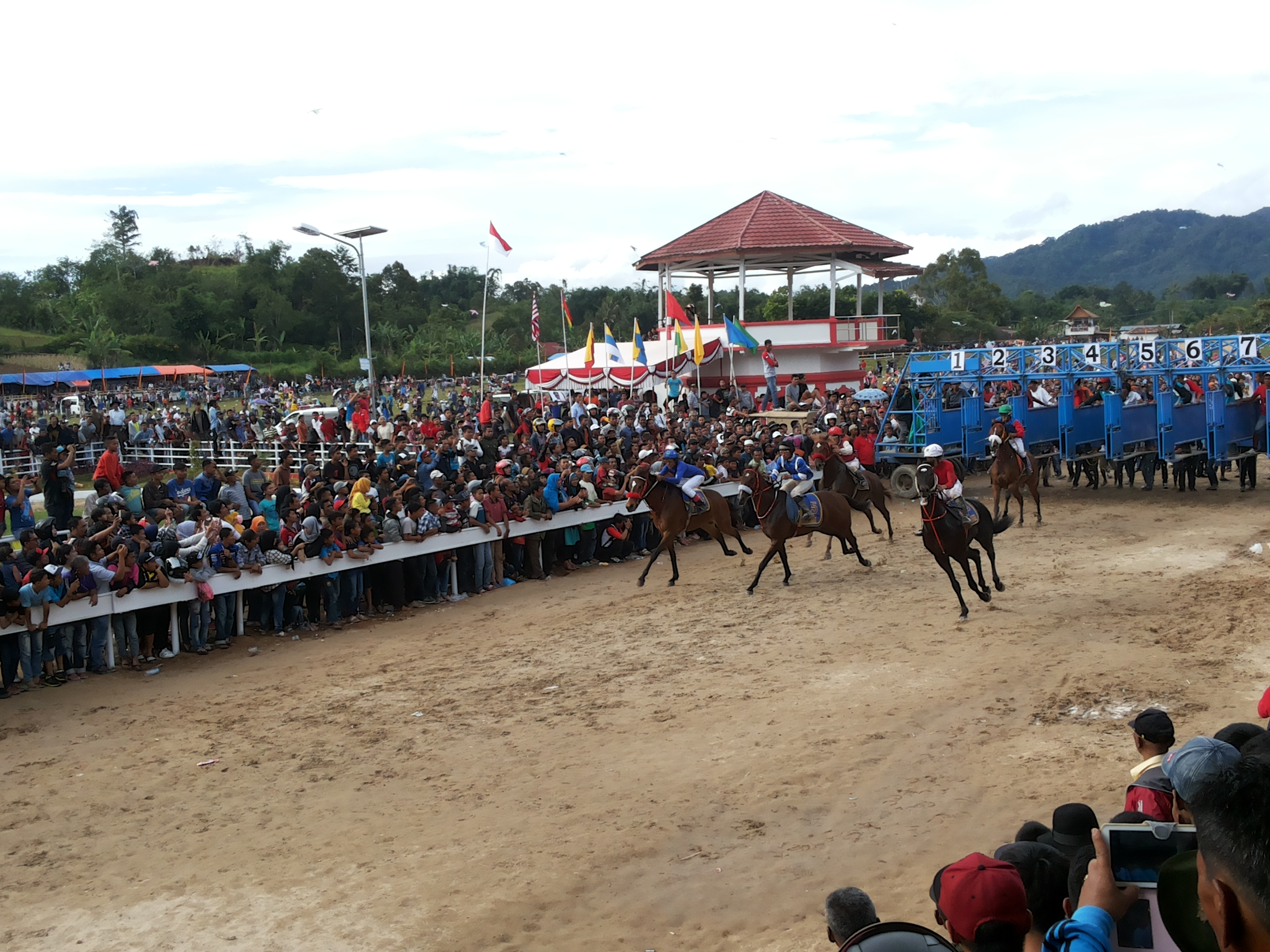
- Bukit Ambacang Racecourse in 2016
- Interactive map of Bukit Ambacang Racecourse; Gelanggang Bukit Ambacang; Galanggang Bukik Ambacang
- Location: Bukittinggi/Agam, West Sumatra, Indonesia
- Coordinates: , 0.282936°S 100.364813°E
- Owned by: Government of Bukittinggi; Government of Agam Regency
- Operated by: Pordasi
- Date opened: 1889
- Race type: Pacu races, Harness (draf bogie)
- Course type: Dirt (Note: Early photographs appear to show a turf track, while the current track suggest change into a dirt surface during the late 20th century; however, no secondary source confirming the timing of this change has yet been identified.)
- Notable races: Kejurnas Series; Wisata Derby

Bukit Ambacang Racecourse (Indonesian:Gelanggang Pacuan Kuda Bukit Ambacang), sometimes Bukik Ambacang Racecourse (Minangkabau: Galanggang Pacu Kudo Bukik Ambacang), is a racecourse located on the border between Bukittinggi and Agam Regency, West Sumatra, Indonesia. Opened in 1889, it is the oldest active racecourse in the country.

== History ==
Organized horse racing in Fort de Kock was documented by 1889, when a racing club known as the Fort-de-Kocksche Wedloop Sociëteit was established. Not long after, a racecourse was opened, with competitive races scheduled by July of the same year. Following the racecourse's establishment, several horse racing venues had been established in other parts of West Sumatra, including Kubu Gadang in Payakumbuh (1906), Bukit Gombak in Batusangkar, and Bancah Laweh in Padang Panjang (1913). This made West Sumatra the region with the most number of venues in Indonesia, the majority of which were constructed during colonial times.

Administratively, the track straddles the border between Bukittinggi and Agam Regency. The northern portion of the track lies within Gadut Nagari (also called Gaduik), Tilatang Kamang District, Agam Regency, while the southern part of the track is administratively located inside Kubu Gulai Bancah, Mandiangin Koto Selayan District, Bukittinggi.

== Physical attributes ==
Bukit Ambacang Racecourse is a dirt oval track with a length of approximately 800 metres. The racecourse includes facilities such as a mounting yard and spectator stands.

Several structures dating from the Dutch East Indies period survive to the present day. These include the rumah bulek (Minangkabau for “roundhouse”), which functioned as a VIP stand reserved for distinguished guests and board of stewards, and the rumah musik (“music house”), an area used by musical ensembles to entertain spectators. A small monument denoting the 40th anniversary of the Fort-de-Kocksche Wedloop Sociëteit as well as the establishment years of other racecourses in West Sumatra is located within the infield of the track.

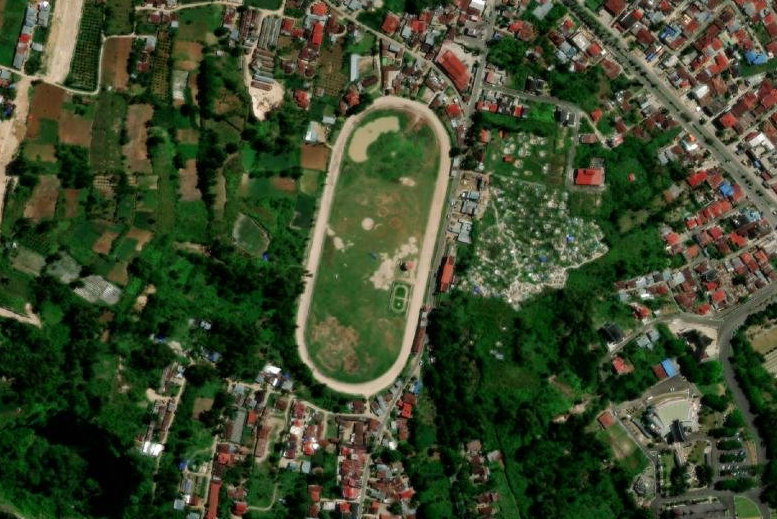
Aerial photo of Bukit Ambacang Racecourse

The racecourse is situated on elevated terrain between the urban area of Bukittinggi and surrounding rural zones of Agam Regency. It also has a panoramic view of Mount Singgalang.

== Transportation ==
The racecourse is located by the West Trans-Sumatra Highway.

== Cultural significance ==
Bukit Ambacang regularly hosts horse racing events at the regional and provincial level, including competitions associated with local celebrations and government/company-sponsored tournaments. These have included events like Open Race Bukittinggi and the annual signature Wisata Derby. Horse racing at the site is commonly associated with community festivals (alek nagari) and serves as a social gathering point for residents from Bukittinggi and neighboring localities.

The racecourse has been cited as an inspiration for a chapter in Sengsara Membawa Nikmat (1929), a novel by Tulis Sutan Sati, which is set in Bukittinggi. The racecourse was also used as a filming location for the 1991 television series adaptation, which was broadcast by TVRI. This racecourse was also used as a filming site for the movie adaptation of The Sinking of van der Wijck in 2013, despite the story's setting taking place in Bancah Laweh.

== Gallery ==
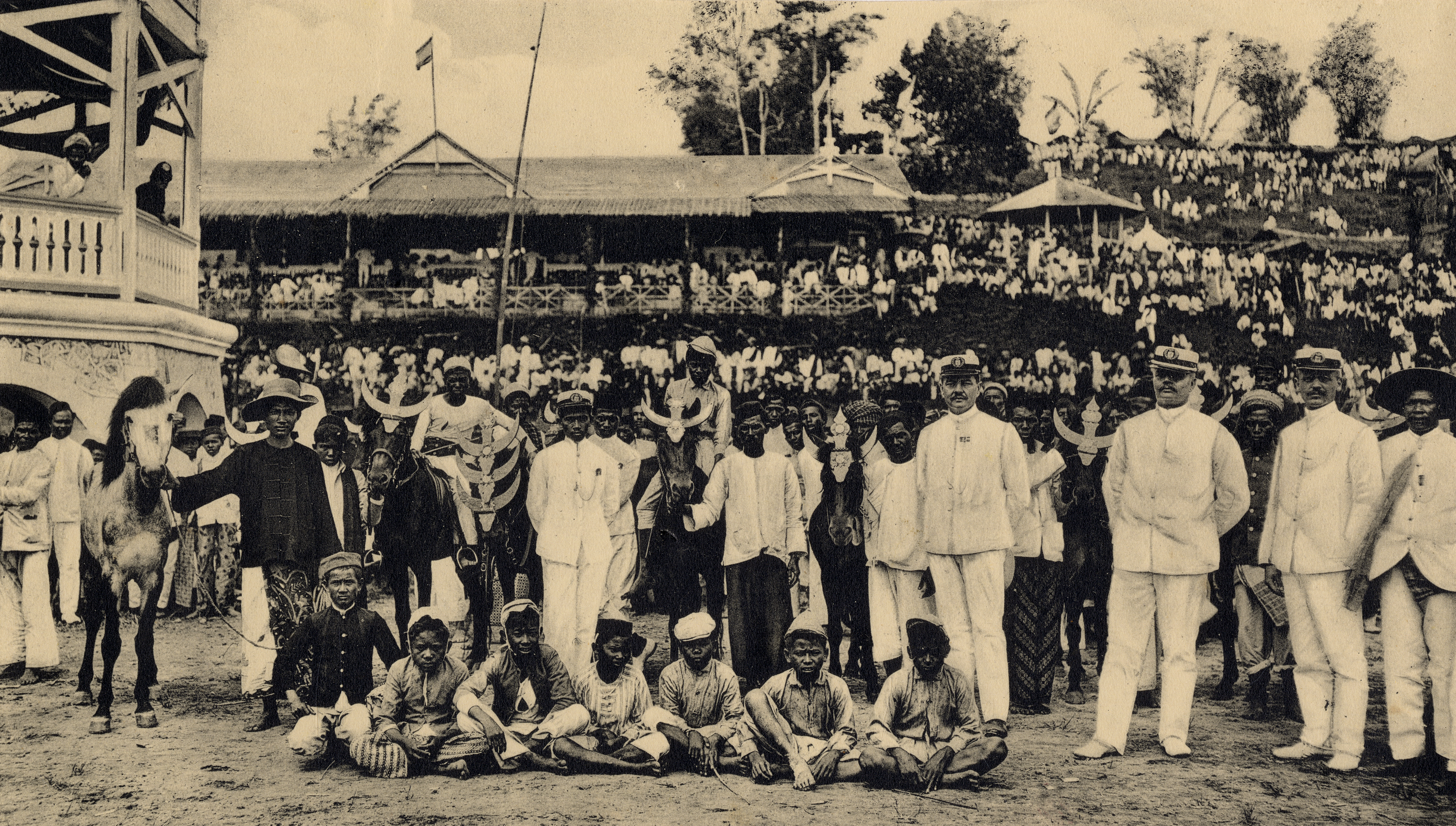
Winning horses decorated with buffalo horns, 1911. The rumah bulek and spectator stands are visible in the background.

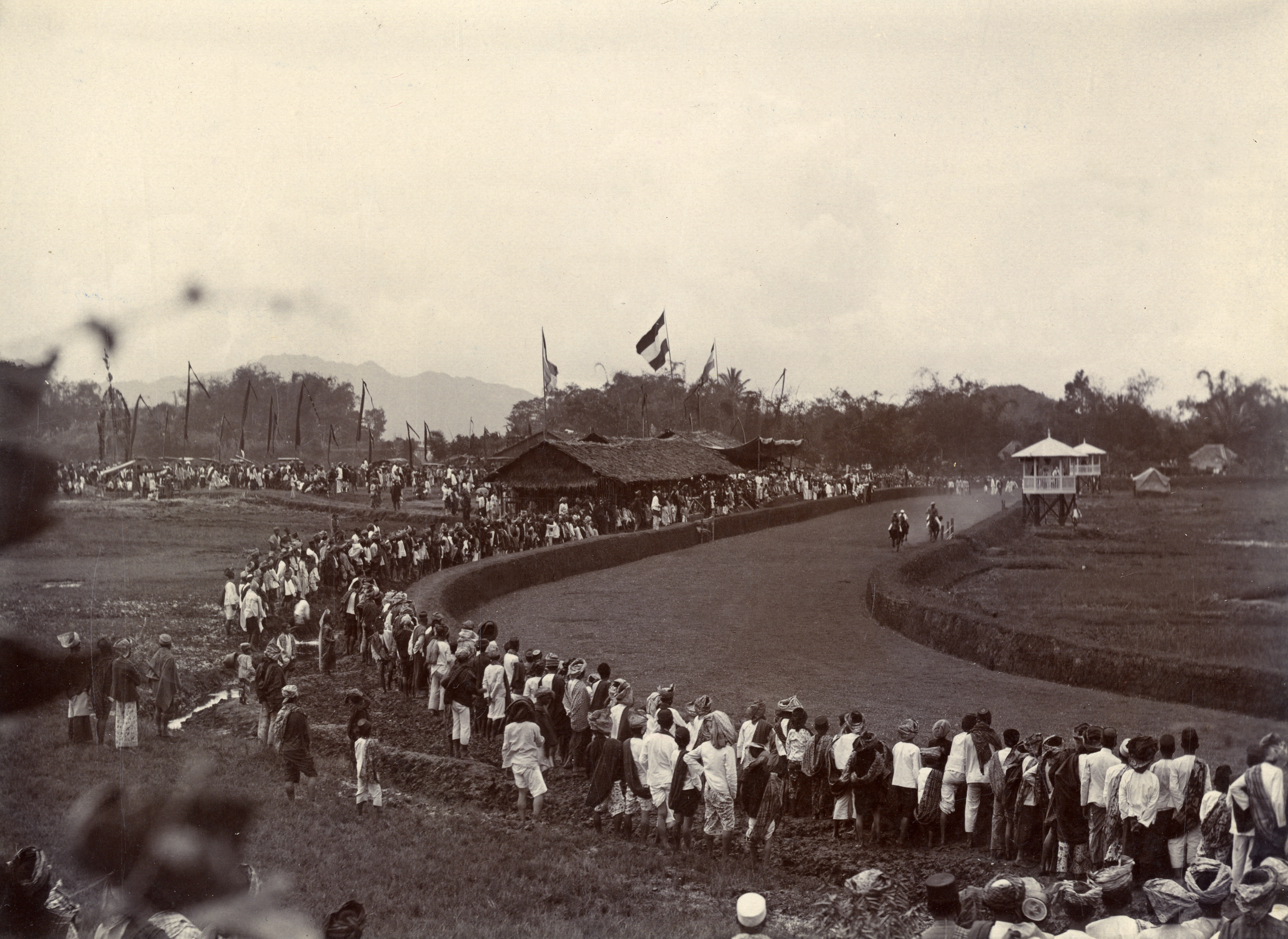
Spectators at a race, c. 1911

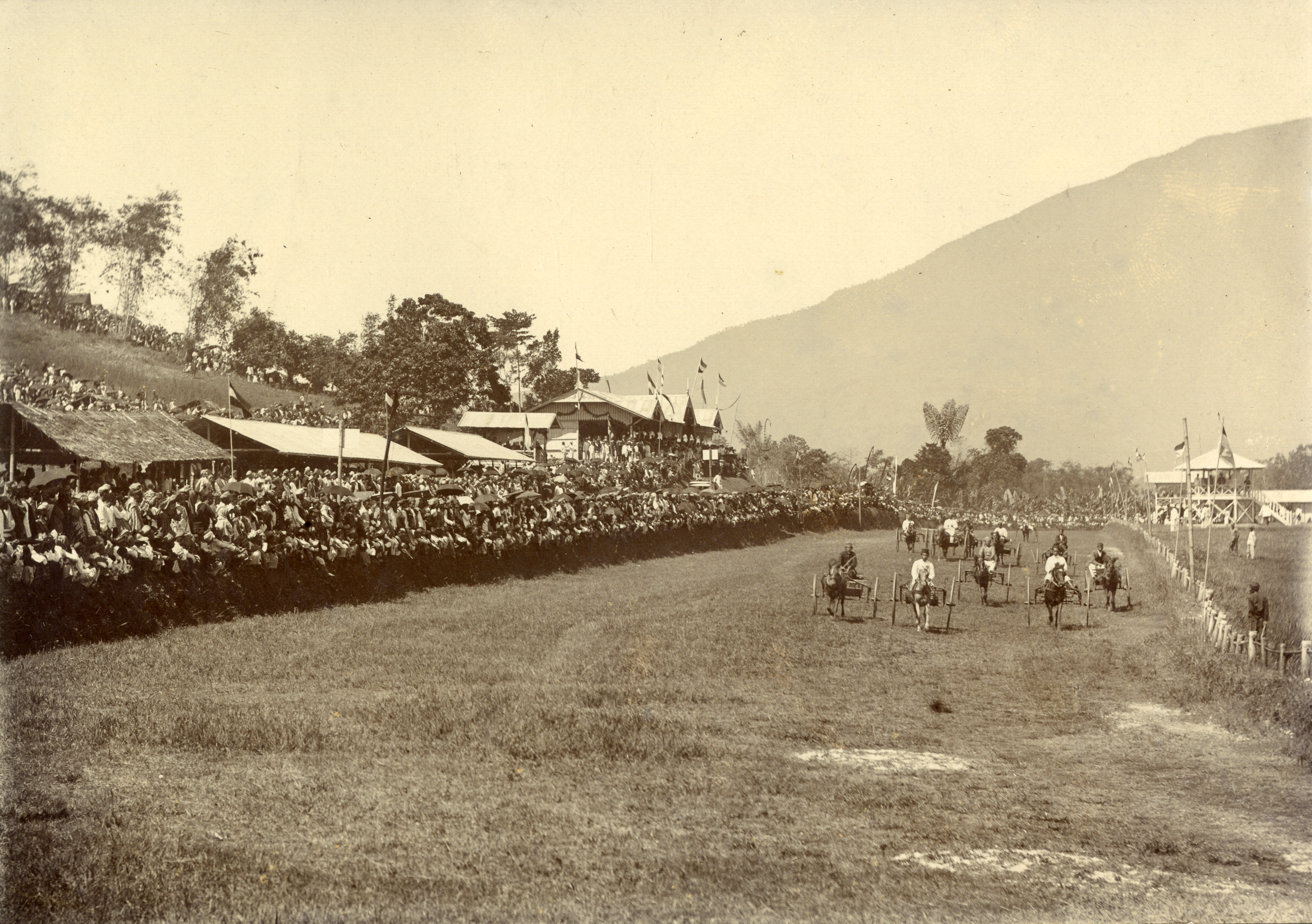
Harness racing, c. 1908

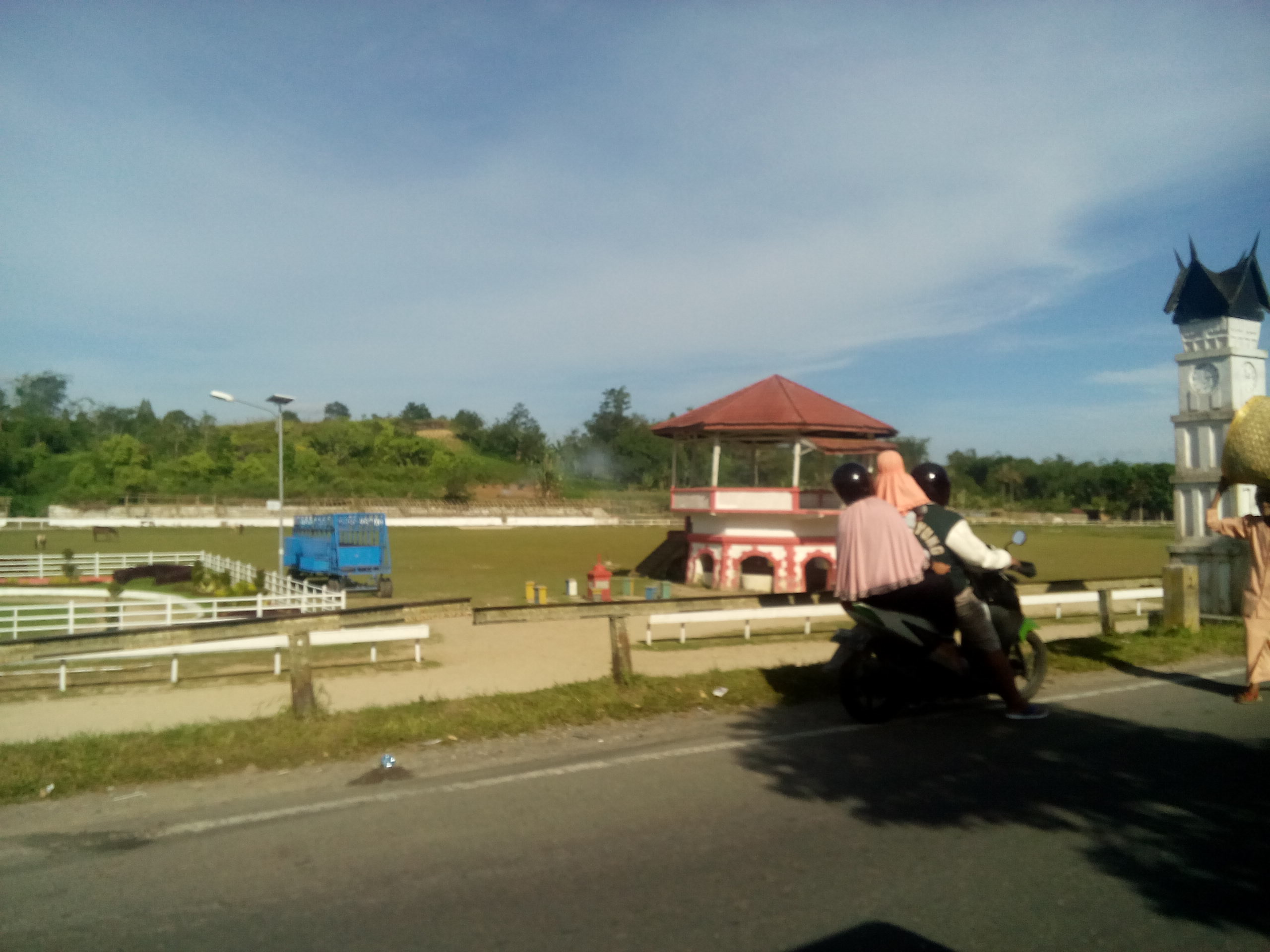
A miniature of Jam Gadang near the racecourse, marking the administrative boundary between Bukittinggi and Agam, 2018

== See also ==
- Horse racing in Indonesia
- Kandih Racecourse — another racecourse located in West Sumatra
