= Sawahlunto Derby =

- Class: 3-year-old derby
- Location: Kandih Racecourse
- Inaugurated: 2007
- Race type: Flat racing

Race information
- Distance: 1500 meters (7½ Furlongs)
- Surface: Dirt
- Track: Right-handed
- Qualification: 3-y-o, Colts & Fillies
- Purse: Rp. 150.000.000 (as of 2025)

The Sawahlunto Derby is a flat horse race in Indonesia held for three-year-old colts and fillies. It is run over a distance of 1500 meters (approximately 0.93 miles or 7½ furlongs), usually in early December.

== History ==
The Sawahlunto Derby was inaugurated in 2007 as part of 119th Sawahlunto City Anniversary Day (Indonesian: Hari Jadi Kota (HJK)), an initiative to promote "sport tourism" in the former mining town. While organized racing in West Sumatra dates back to the colonial era at venues like Bukit Ambacang (1889), the Sawahlunto Derby represents a modern professionalization of the traditional Minangkabau pacu kudo.

=== 2020 cancellation ===
The 2020 edition of the race was cancelled due to the COVID-19 pandemic in Indonesia. The event returned in 2021 with strict health protocols and limited spectators, before returning to full capacity in 2022.

=== 2025 charity ===
Due to the 2025 Sumatra floods and landslides, the 18th edition held in 2025 dedicated its entire revenue from ticket sales and VIP contributions to the humanitarian cause. The event successfully raised Rp32,225,000, which the organizers announced would be converted into basic necessities for flood and landslide victims across West Sumatra.

== Step races ==
Before a horse is allowed to compete in the Sawahlunto Derby, they must first go through a preliminary round. This consists of two heats, with 12 horses in each heat and the top 6 horses qualifying for the Sawahlunto Derby.

No	Race name	Grade	Distance
1	3 years old Derby Heat I	Elimination	Dirt 1500m
2	3 years old Derby Heat II	Elimination	Dirt 1500m
3	Sawahlunto Derby	Derby	Dirt 1500m

=== New format ===
For the 2025 edition, the organizing committee implemented a significant modification to the competition format by eliminating the qualifying heat rounds.

==== Regulatory basis ====
The decision to forego the heat rounds was authorized by the Board of Stewards and the organizing committee, adhering to the results of the Indonesian Equestrian Sports Association (PORDASI) National Working Meeting (Rakernas) Revision dated September 10, 2025 (Point 4, sub-points A-E). This format change was officially communicated to stable owners and trainers during the barrier drawing session held on November 30, 2025.

==== Ranking mechanism ====
In lieu of physical qualifying races, the selection of the 12 horses eligible for the Main Race was determined through a ranking system based on historical performance records (track record). The Board of Stewards assessed candidates using the following criteria:

- Regional Entrants: Points were calculated based on the horses' performance in the two most recent championships: the Payakumbuh Horse Race and the Padang Panjang Horse Race.
- External Entrants: Evaluation was based on the results of the last two races participated in by the horse in their respective regions, provided that the distance and age categories were equivalent.

==== Competition implications ====
Based on this ranking system, participants were allocated into two final categories:

- Main Class (Derby): Horses ranked 1st through 12th qualified for the main gates to compete for the 2025 Sawahlunto Derby title over a distance of 1,500 meters.
- Consolation Class (Derby Candidates): Horses ranked 13th and below were diverted to compete in the Class AB 3-Year-Old (Kelas Remaja) category over a distance of 1,300 meters.

== Records ==
Most wins by a jockey:

- 2 wins – Yoserizal (2011, 2017)
- 2 wins – Rudy Junior (2015, 2024)

Most wins by a trainer:

- 2 wins – Iwan Kurniawan (2008, 2010)

Most wins by an owner:

- 2 wins – Beni Amniza Putra (2016, 2021)

Fastest winning time (1,500m):

- 1:38.48 – Pesona Asmara (2008)
- 1:38.99 – Delima Queen (2016)
- 1:39.21 – Ratu Aquila (2022)

== Winners since 2007 ==
Year	Winner	Jockey	Trainer	Owner(s)	Time	Ref.
2007	Spirit Sikumbang	N. Suryana	Ferry Saddak	Sikumbang Stable	1:43.99	
2008	Pesona Asmara	T. Firmansyah	Iwan Kurniawan	Rajawali Stable	1:38.48	
2009	Pesona Demokrat	Hanny Suoth	Michel Umboh	Effendi Amir	1:50.70	
2010	Blezzing BMW	Wawan	Iwan Kurniawan	BMW Stable	1:39.38	
2011	Siti Jenar	Yoserizal	Maidison	Satria Stable	1:42.21	
2012	Permata Sartika	Antoni	Kamba Darus	Wismar	1:40.66	
2013	Salido	T. Pantow	Coen Singal	Erizal Chaniago	1:42.99	
2014	Ambun Marapi	T. Buyung	Atrizal	Nikita Stable	1:39.58	
2015	Putri Binari	Rudy Junior	Firdaus Hanafi	(Note: Conflict Between Sources. Need Further Research. (December 2025))	1:43.18	
2016	Delima Queen	Jhonny Adrian	Lim Jack	Beni Amniza Putra	1:38.99	
2017	Sako Biru	Yoserizal	Wendra	John Nasril	1:39.30	
2018	Pioneer Srigunting	Ridwan Barat	-	Derri Asta	1:41.59; 1:43.78 (Note: 1:41.59 is reported by Antaranews while 1:43.78 is reported by Cindua Mato Channel (December 2025))	
2019	Black Dragon	Hermansyah	Ben	Amril Jailani	1:43.97	
2020	Cancelled due to COVID-19 pandemic					
2021	Cahaya Delima	Meikel Soleran	Ricky	Beni Amniza Putra	1:40.64	
2022	Ratu Aquila	Rian Firmansyah	Erwan Nasril	Sako Biro	1:39.21	
2023	King of Istana	Yani Rondonuwu	Nicky Pantouw	Istana Stable	1:40.54	
2024	Romantic Spartan	Rudy Junior	Tuan Amris	San Marino Stable	1:40.81	
2025	Milea Guti	Fajar Walangitan	Syafrinal	Guti Stable	1:44.60	

== See also ==
- Horse racing in Indonesia
- List of racehorses
- Indonesia Derby
- PORDASI
