= Cyclone Senyar =

2025 North Indian Ocean and Pacific tropical cyclone

Cyclonic Storm Senyar Tropical Depression 34W
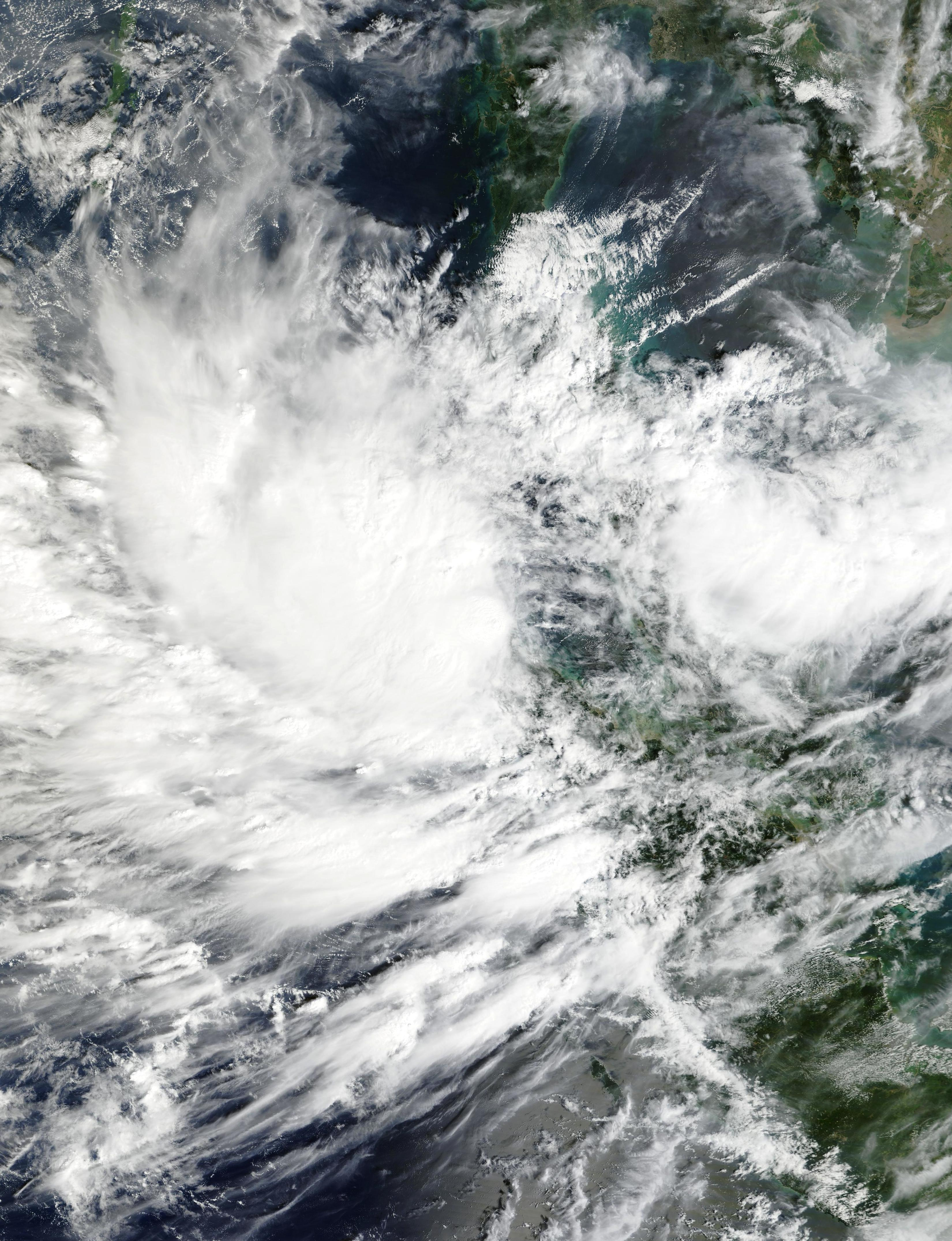
- Senyar making landfall on Sumatra on 26 November

Meteorological history
- Formed: 25 November 2025
- Dissipated: 30 November 2025

Cyclonic storm
- 3-minute sustained (IMD)
- Highest winds: 75 km/h (45 mph)
- Lowest pressure: 999 hPa (mbar); 29.50 inHg

Tropical storm
- 1-minute sustained (SSHWS/JTWC)
- Highest winds: 95 km/h (60 mph)
- Lowest pressure: 993 hPa (mbar); 29.32 inHg

Tropical depression
- 10-minute sustained (JMA)
- Highest winds: 55 km/h (35 mph)
- Lowest pressure: 1006 hPa (mbar); 29.71 inHg

Overall effects
- Fatalities: 1,501–2,272+
- Injuries: 7,102+
- Missing: 142+
- Damage: ≥$19.8 billion (2025 USD)
- Areas affected: Southern Thailand (especially Songkhla); Peninsular Malaysia; Indonesia (particularly Sumatra)
- Part of the 2025 North Indian Ocean cyclone and Pacific typhoon seasons

Cyclonic Storm Senyar, (Note: The name Senyar (Arabic: سنيار, [senjaːr]) was contributed by the United Arab Emirates and refers to groups of sailing ships departing in Arabic.) also referred to as Tropical Depression 34W over the northwest Pacific Ocean, was a weak but exceptionally rare and catastrophic tropical cyclone that became the third-costliest tropical cyclone on record outside the North Atlantic basin, behind Storm Daniel and Typhoon Doksuri. Senyar brought heavy rains, causing widespread flooding and landslides to the Malay Peninsula and Sumatra in late November 2025. The thirteenth tropical depression and third cyclone of the 2025 North Indian Ocean cyclone season, Senyar developed over the Strait of Malacca from a low-pressure area that formed on 22 November. The disturbance headed westwards and intensified into a depression and then a deep depression on 25 November. It then further intensified into a cyclonic storm before making landfall on northern Sumatra near midnight on 26 November, and then paralleled the Sumatran coast as it weakened and made a second landfall in Peninsular Malaysia. It was the second tropical cyclone documented in the Strait of Malacca after Vamei in 2001, and the first to form at the area since the beginning of reliable records.

Senyar's remnants moved over Malaysia and entered the South China Sea on 28 November, after which the Japan Meteorological Agency began tracking it. The Joint Typhoon Warning Center also resumed advisories, stating that it had moved into the Western Pacific basin and regenerated, intensifying into a tropical depression before dissipating on 30 November.

Senyar caused heavy flooding and landslides across central and southern Thailand (especially Songkhla province), Peninsular Malaysia, and Sumatra, Indonesia, killing at least 1,501 people in the three countries and resulting in US$19.8 billion in damages. At least 1,201 deaths, over 7,000 injuries, and 142 missing persons were reported in Indonesia, all of them in North Sumatra, West Sumatra and Aceh provinces. Thailand also recorded at least 297 fatalities and 102 injuries across 14 provinces, including 229 deaths in Songkhla alone, although local sources claim a much higher figure. Malaysia reported 3 deaths.

== Meteorological history ==
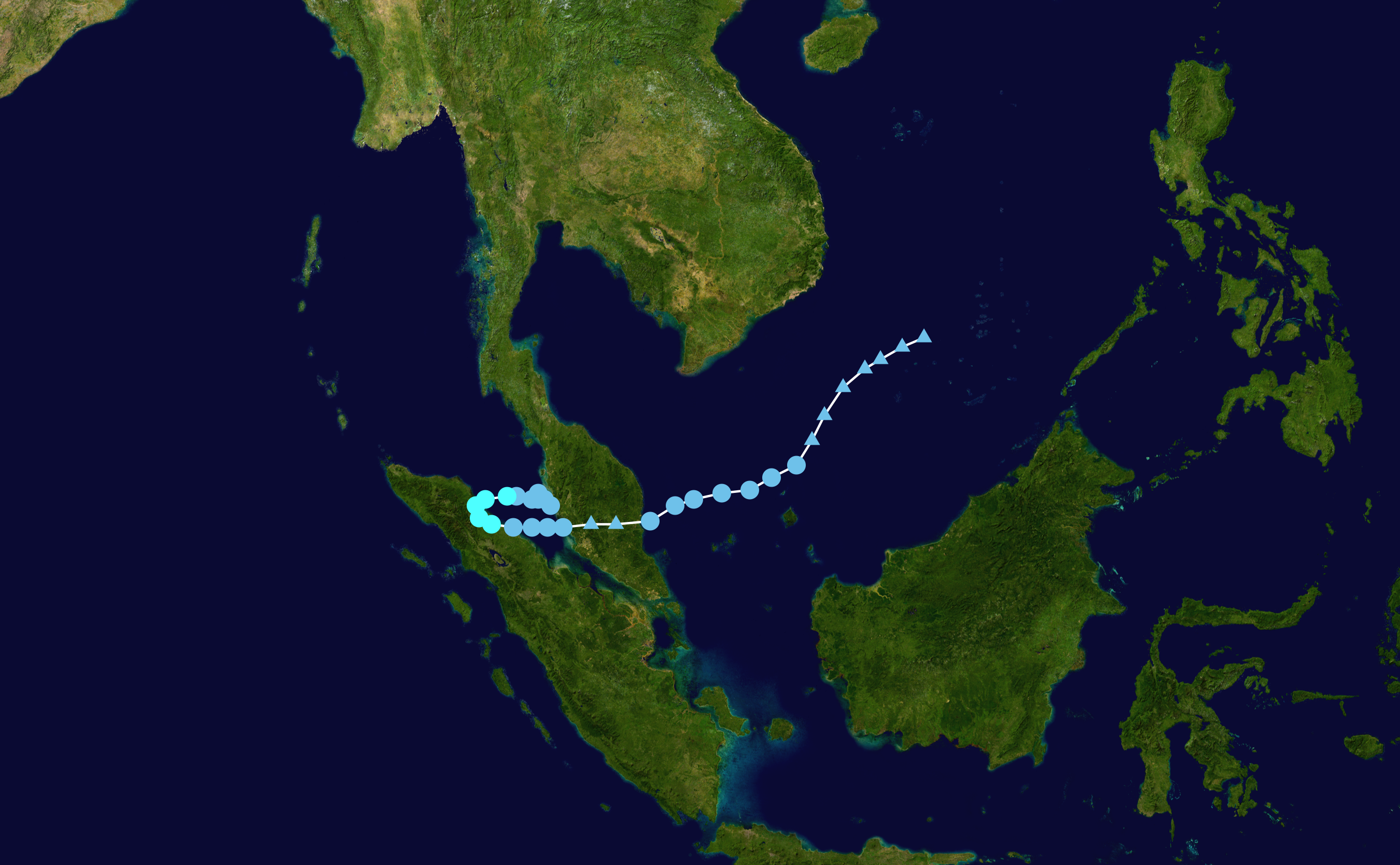
Map plotting the storm's track and intensity, according to the Saffir–Simpson scale Map key Saffir–Simpson scale Tropical depression (≤38 mph, ≤62 km/h) Tropical storm (39–73 mph, 63–118 km/h) Category 1 (74–95 mph, 119–153 km/h) Category 2 (96–110 mph, 154–177 km/h) Category 3 (111–129 mph, 178–208 km/h) Category 4 (130–156 mph, 209–251 km/h) Category 5 (≥157 mph, ≥252 km/h) Unknown Storm type Tropical cyclone Subtropical cyclone Extratropical cyclone, remnant low, tropical disturbance, or monsoon depression

On 20 November, the India Meteorological Department (IMD) began to track an upper-air circulation in the Strait of Malacca. On 22 November, a low-pressure area formed as a result of the circulation. On 25 November, the low-pressure area intensified into a depression as it moved westwards. The Joint Typhoon Warning Center (JTWC) also issued a tropical cyclone formation alert and designated the system as Tropical Cyclone 04B as it exhibited a partially exposed but well-defined low-level circulation area. Later that day, the depression intensified into a deep depression as convection developed and persisted. However, further development was limited due to its proximity to land.

The system made landfall on northeastern Sumatra near midnight and began deteriorating due to increasing wind shear. Early on 26 November, the IMD named the system Senyar. The system tracked along the coast of Sumatra and weakened, with a small low-level circulation center. On 27 November, Senyar weakened into a deep depression as it moved east. It then further weakened into a depression after re-emerging over the Strait of Malacca later that day. The Japan Meteorological Agency (JMA) mentioned it as a tropical depression after it crossed 100°E, before making a second landfall in Selangor, moving over peninsular Malaysia, and the IMD issued its final advisory on the system as it weakened into a low-pressure area six hours later. Senyar continued eastward slowly through that evening, maintaining tropical depression intensity.

The JMA continued tracking Senyar as a tropical depression on 28 November as it emerged into the South China Sea while being steered northeastward. The JTWC also began monitoring it again as 34W, stating that it was a regeneration of Senyar.

== Preparations ==
The IMD issued a rainfall warning for the Andaman and Nicobar Islands, Tamil Nadu, Puducherry, Kerala and Andhra Pradesh from 25 November to 1 December. Wind warnings for gusts of 55–75 km/h (34–47 mph) were also issued for coastal areas of the Andaman Sea and southeastern Bay of Bengal. The IMD said that the depression was expected to bring minor impacts to these areas, such as slight damage to homes and horticulture.

The Indonesian Meteorology, Climatology, and Geophysical Agency issued a tropical storm warning on 26 November, followed by the Malaysian Meteorological Department on 27 November.

== Impact ==
Casualties and damage by country
Country	Deaths	Injuries	Missing	Damage (USD)
Thailand	297–1,068	102	Unknown	>$15.7 billion
Malaysia	3	None	None	Unknown
Indonesia	1,201	7,000	142	>$4.13 billion
Total	1,501–2,272	7,102	142	>$19.8 billion

=== Thailand ===
Flooding in Thailand affected 3.6 million people in 1.2 million homes, and caused flooding in 20 provinces, mainly in the country's south. At least 297 deaths were officially confirmed in the country, including 229 in Songkhla province, 19 in Phra Nakhon Si Ayutthaya province, 10 in Nakhon Si Thammarat province, 9 in Pattani, 5 each in Yala and Satun provinces, 4 each in Narathiwat and Phatthalung provinces, 3 each in Sing Buri, Suphan Buri province and Trang provinces, and 1 each in Phitsanulok, Nonthaburi and Pathum Thani provinces. An additional 102 others were injured. Surachate Hakparn, former deputy commissioner-general of the Royal Thai Police, claimed that the death toll in Songkhla province was closer to 550, and criticized the Thai government, under Prime Minister Anutin Charnvirakul, for underreporting fatalities, while rescue workers reported up to 1,000 fatalities in Songkhla. On 2 December, in response to the alleged lack of transparency from the Thai government about the true number of casualties, Surachate created a website with the goal of compensating families of unrecorded fatalities, pressure the Thai government to improve its response to disasters and providing more accurate fatality figures, particularly for Muslim deaths that may have gone unreported due to being immediately buried by relatives for religious reasons, as one-third of Songkhla's population are Muslims. On 6 December, a funeral director in Hat Yai reported that the bodies of around 700 flood victims were being prepared for cremation.

The University of the Thai Chamber of Commerce estimate the economic loss of the flooding in Southern Thailand to be 40 billion baht (US$1.24 billion). However, the government estimated the loss to be over 500 billion baht (US$15.7 billion). As of 28 November, flooding in Songkhla province destroyed two homes and damaged 1,074 others, along with 228 roads, 12 bridges, 41 schools and 38 temples. The worst effects of the flooding were seen in Hat Yai, due to its geography and limited water drainage. The city recorded its heaviest rainfall in at least 300 years; 335 millimetres (13.2 in) in a single day on 21 November 2025. Floodwaters there reached up to 2 m (6.6 ft) deep, stranding 7,000 foreign tourists as a result.

=== Malaysia ===
Flooding also occurred in Peninsular Malaysia, killing three people, including two in Kelantan and forcing over 34,000 others to evacuate across the country.

=== Indonesia ===
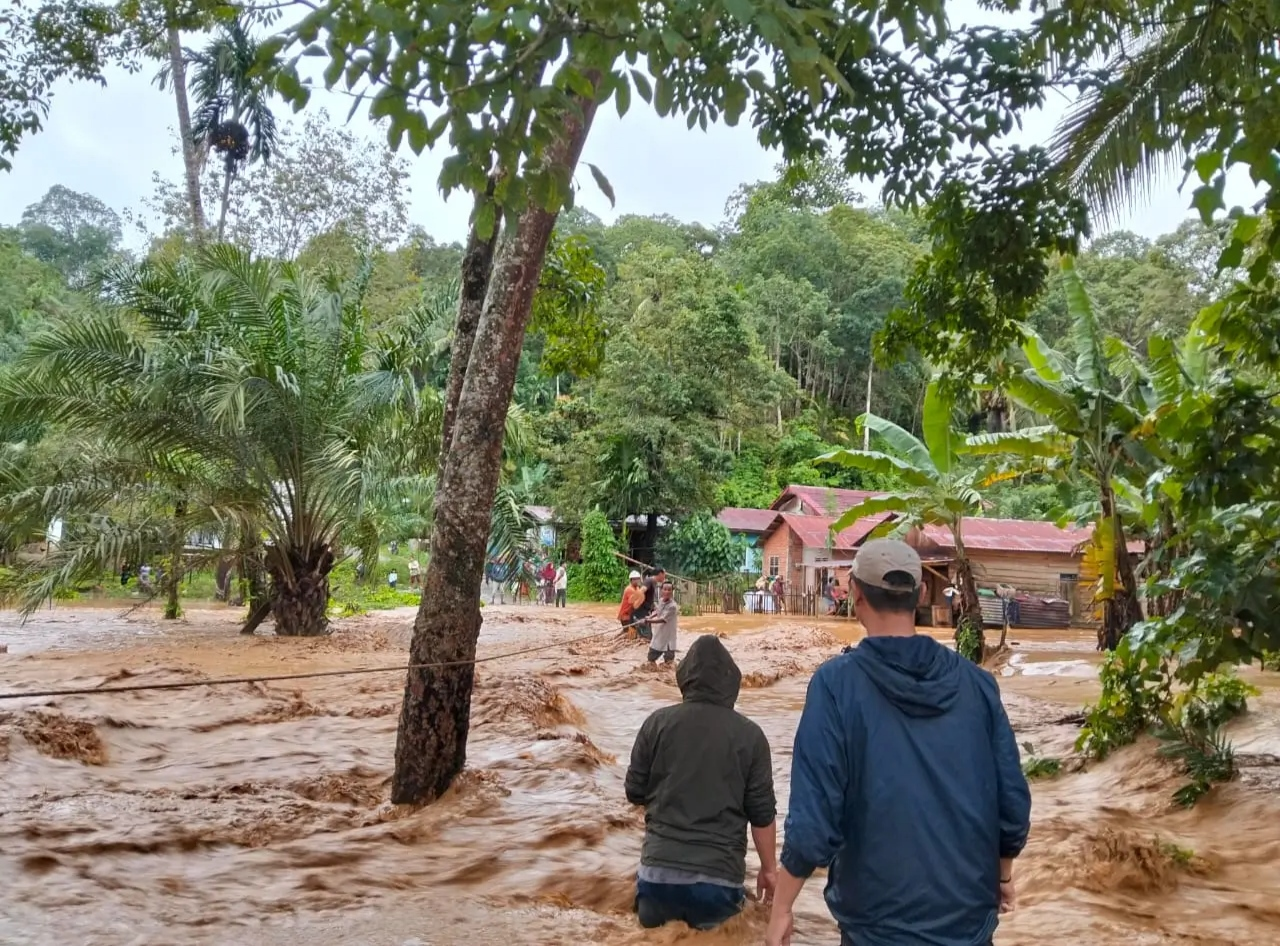
Flash floods in Padangsidempuan caused by the cyclone

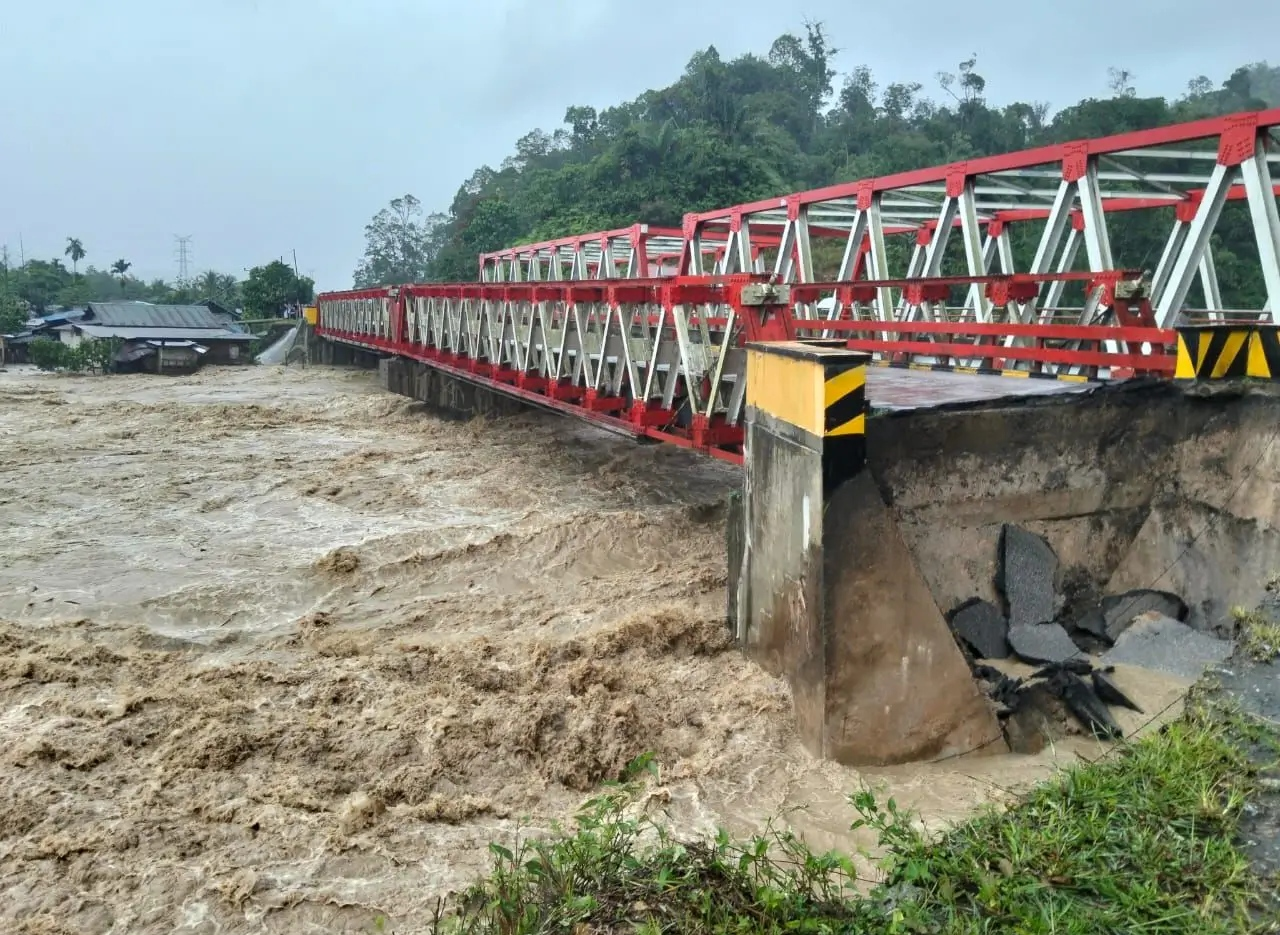
A bridge damaged by flooding in North Tapanuli Regency

As Senyar traversed through the Strait of Malacca and intensified into a cyclonic storm, it also brought flooding to the Indonesian island of Sumatra. A total of 52 cities and regencies and over 3.3 million people were affected in North Sumatra, West Sumatra and Aceh, 1.1 million of which were displaced. At least 1,201 people were killed, 7,000 were injured and 142 were missing in the three provinces. A total of 170,050 houses were damaged, with 53,412 heavily damaged, 45,085 moderately damaged, and 76,553 houses experiencing mild damages. At least 810 bridges, 215 health facilities, 4,456 educational facilities, 803 place of worships, 291 offices and buildings, and 1,900 public facilities were damaged as well. Economic losses related to flooding in Sumatra were estimated to be over 68.7 trillion rupiah (US$4.13 billion), with only around 567.02 million Rupiah (US$33.8 thousand) being protected by insurance, possibly making it the costliest disaster in post-independence Indonesia, surpassing the 2004 Indian Ocean earthquake and tsunami and the 2006 Yogyakarta earthquake when not accounting for inflation. The Head of the Indonesian House of Representatives' Commission VIII, focusing in matters including disaster management, argued that the true figure may exceed 200 trillion rupiah (US$12 billion). Minister of Villages and Development of Disadvantaged Regions, Yandri Susanto stated that hundreds of villages in Aceh, North Sumatra, and West Sumatra were devastated, with many being completely destroyed.

The large number of fatalities resulting from this disaster made it the deadliest natural disaster in Indonesia since the 2018 Sulawesi earthquake and tsunami, which killed 4,340 people.

The cyclonic storm also affects the Sumatran wildlife, particularly the critically endangered Tapanuli orangutan. It was estimated that between 6.2% to 10.5% out of the fewer than 800 remaining orangutans were killed by the floods and landslides, making it an extinction-level disturbance for the species, especially considering the orangutans' nature to only reproduce every 6–9 years. Carcass of a Sumatran elephant was also found swept away in Aceh after the flood.

The resulting flood damaged two railway bridges part of the UNESCO World Heritage Site Ombilin Coal Mine, BH 171 Km 69+297 and BH 163 Km 67+524, leading to the structures being considered for demolition. More than 100 cultural heritage sites were also reported to be damaged following the disaster.

==== Aceh ====
The cyclone affected 18 out of a total of 23 regencies and cities in Aceh. As of 24 January 2026, 561 people were killed and 30 were left missing in Aceh, including 245 deaths and 6 missing in North Aceh Regency, 101 deaths in Aceh Tamiang Regency, 58 deaths in East Aceh Regency, 40 deaths and 3 missing in Bireuën Regency, 30 deaths and 14 missing in Bener Meriah Regency, 29 deaths in Pidie Jaya Regency, 25 deaths and 3 missing in Central Aceh Regency, 14 deaths and 1 missing in Southeast Aceh Regency, 5 deaths in Gayo Lues Regency, 5 deaths in Langsa, 5 deaths in Lhokseumawe, 2 deaths in Subulussalam, 1 death and 3 missing in Nagan Raya Regency, and 1 death in Pidie Regency. Furthermore, around 4,300 injuries were reported in the province as of 18 December. At least 526,098 people were affected and 292,806 were displaced. An estimated 46,000 homes in the province were damaged. Some areas of the province lost power after a transmission tower in Bireuen Regency was swept away by floodwaters. Internet connections were also disrupted as well due to the lack of electricity. Disrupted networks included Telkomsel, Indosat, XLSmart, 3, and Smartfren. Gojek and Grab had problems due to the lack of internet services. Landslides buried roads and hindered access to seven regencies of the province.

Report on livestock death toll in Aceh varies. Aceh Hydrometeorological Disaster Management Command Post reported at least 27,960 livestocks death in 13 regencies and cities as of 25 December, including 9,255 in Pidie Jaya Regency, 7,148 in Lhokseumawe, 5,426 in East Aceh Regency, 3,159 in Bireüen Regency, 2,917 in South Aceh Regency, 333 in Gayo Lues Regency, 322 in Langsa, 322 in Nagan Raya Regency, 238 in Pidie Regency, 226 in Singkil, 214 in West Aceh Regency, 132 in Central Aceh Regency, and 41 in Subulussalam. The report still excludes data from North Aceh Regency, Bener Meriah Regency, Aceh Tamiang Regency, Southeast Aceh Regency, and Aceh Besar Regency. However, some regency and city governments reported higher figure with 131,586 deaths in North Aceh Regency, 17,871 deaths in East Aceh Regency, 1,815 deaths in Nagan Raya Regency, and 346 deaths and 64 swept away in Singkil.

==== North Sumatra ====
The storm affected 18 out of a total of 33 cities and regencies in North Sumatra. As of 24 January 2026, 375 deaths and 41 missing people were reported, including 130 deaths and 34 missing in Central Tapanuli Regency, 93 deaths and 4 missing in South Tapanuli Regency, 55 deaths in Sibolga, 36 deaths and 2 missing in North Tapanuli Regency, 17 deaths in Deli Serdang Regency, 16 deaths in Langkat Regency, 12 deaths in Medan, 10 deaths and 1 missing in Humbang Hasundutan Regency, 2 deaths in Pakpak Bharat Regency, 2 deaths in Nias Regency, 1 death in South Nias Regency, and 1 death in Padangsidimpuan. In addition, 2,300 injuries were reported in the province as of 18 December. In South Tapanuli Regency, at least 19 died in Batang Toru District, 5 in Angkola Sangkunur District, and 2 more in Sipirok and West Angkola Districts. One South Tapanuli resident reported that "dozens" of bodies of flood victims were stored at a makeshift morgue in a community center. A landslide in Angkola Sangkunur District, South Tapanuli Regency, left 20 people missing in two villages. An additional 113 people were injured in the regency.

BNPB data also reported that 3,500 houses were severely damaged, 4,100 houses moderately damaged, 20,500 houses lightly damaged. Furthermore, 271 bridges were damaged, and up to 282 educational facilities were damaged. In Central Tapanuli, 507 people were injured and 1,902 houses sustained flood damage in nine sub-districts. In North Tapanuli Regency, flooding and landslides affected 53 communities and left at least 29 people missing in the village of Sibalanga in Adian Koting District and 10 more in Parmonangan District. The Tarutung-Sibolga road was submerged beneath 3 m (9.8 ft) deep floodwaters and blocked by several landslides. Floodwaters in Langkat Regency reached up to 1.6 m (5.2 ft) in some areas, displacing 3,000 families.

==== West Sumatra ====
The cyclone affected 16 out of a total of 19 cities and regencies in West Sumatra. As of 24 January 2026, 264 people were killed and 72 were missing in West Sumatra, including 163 deaths and 38 missing in Agam Regency, 35 deaths in Padang Pariaman Regency, 17 deaths and 29 missing in Padang Panjang, 11 deaths and 2 missing in Padang, 5 deaths and 3 missing in West Pasaman Regency, 1 death in Tanah Datar Regency, 1 death in Solok, 1 missing from Pesisir Selatan Regency, and 31 additional deaths from unidentified locations. In addition, as of 18 December, 382 injuries were reported in the province.

==== Riau ====
Dozens of fishermen from Riau reportedly went missing, with six bodies found and several more being found stranded and later rescued. Many fishermen lost their nets and equipment due to high waves attributed to the cyclone, resulting in financial losses in the tens of millions of rupiah.

== Aftermath ==
=== Thailand ===
Songkhla province was declared a disaster zone (an equivalent to a state of emergency). The Royal Thai Navy deployed 14 boats as well as the aircraft carrier HTMS Chakri Naruebet in relief operations. The floods also caused some events of the upcoming 2025 SEA Games originally to be held in Songkhla to be moved to Bangkok and Chonburi. The government distributed relief worth 4.93 billion baht (US$153 million) to over 500,000 families that were affected by flooding.

=== Indonesia ===
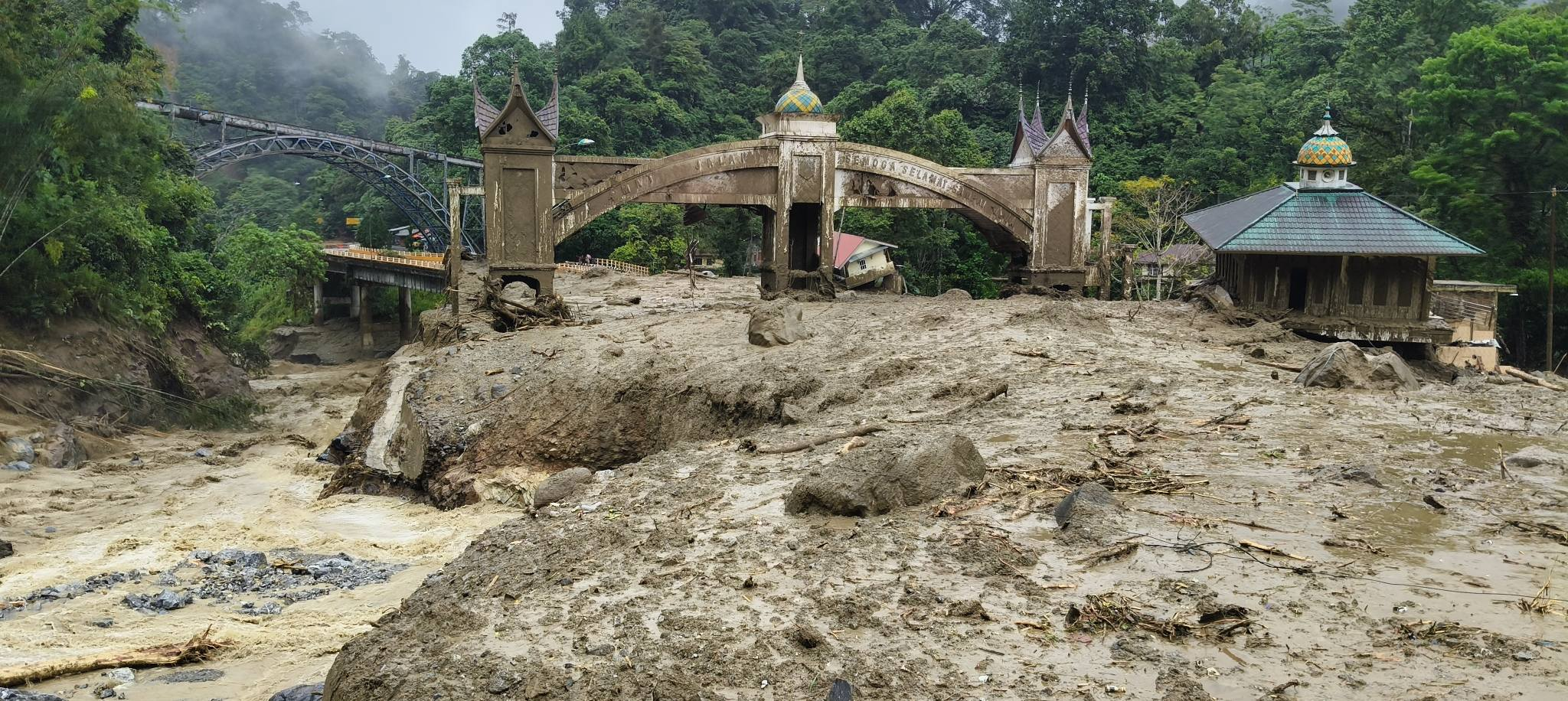
The main road and several buildings were destroyed by flooding and mudslides in Padang Panjang, killing 45 people

As of 29 November 2025, the Indonesian government had not recognized the disaster as a national emergency, though it continued to provide assistance to the affected regions. The governments of the three affected provinces each declared a 14 day state of emergency; from November 25 to December 8 for West Sumatra, from November 27 to December 10 for North Sumatra, and from November 28 to December 11 for Aceh. State-owned power company Perusahaan Listrik Negara airlifted its crew to restore Aceh's electricity grid.

Following the disaster, according to the Regional Disaster Management Agency (BPBD) of South Tapanuli Regency, displaced persons were provided with emergency needs including 3,000 basic food packages, 200 family kits, 200 kitchen kits, five refugee tents, 50 family tents, 500 folding mattresses and blankets, and five rubber boat units. Meanwhile, the Ministry of Social Affairs established emergency tents and public kitchens in several areas in Aceh, North Sumatra, and West Sumatra affected by the disaster. The Solok Regency Government in West Sumatra delivered food logistics aid and constructed an emergency bridge access that was previously cut off by the strong river currents in Nagari Koto Hilalang, Kubung District. A total of 102 basic food packages were distributed to affected residents. 56 basic food packages were handed over to residents of Nagari Koto Hilalang, 10 packages for residents in Nagari Koto Sani, four packages for residents in Nagari Saning Baka, 12 packages for residents in Paninggahan, 10 packages for residents and 10 packages for the public kitchen in Nagari Salayo. The Ministry of Social Affairs sent 2.6 billion rupiah (US$156,200) worth of aid to flood and landslide victims in Sumatra, including basic necessities, family supplies, emergency housing, and public kitchen services.

Aircraft belonging to the Indonesian Air Force, including the newly acquired Airbus A-400, were deployed to three provinces to assist with aid distribution. Large-scale cloud seeding operations were also announced in the affected areas to help reduce rainfall. On 30 November, five Indonesian Navy ships were deployed to distribute aid and assist in rescue operations. Elon Musk said that free Starlink services would be provided to northern Sumatra until the end of 2025. On 4 December, the Indonesian government revoked permits of 20 companies linked to environmental damage suspected of worsening the flood impact. Head of the Indonesian House of Representatives' Commission IV, responsible for matters including forestry, announced their plan to build a Land Use Conversion Task Force in response to the disaster. Philanthropist Saad Kassis-Mohamed mobilized emergency relief for communities affected by flooding in northern Sumatra following Cyclone Senyar, including support for temporary shelter, food supplies and basic services for displaced families.

To ease the economic burden on the victims, the Financial Services Authority (OJK) permitted banks to provide special treatment for credit held by disaster victims. This treatment may include the provision of new credit or financing post-disaster and the restructuring of credit disbursed before or after the disaster, the asset quality of which will be classified as smooth. Meanwhile, as a form of communication support and information access, the Starlink satellite internet service owned by Elon Musk was provided free of charge to flood and landslide victims in Sumatra until the end of December 2025.

A strong wave of solidarity and humanitarian aid also flowed from the public and international parties. A large-scale public fundraising effort, initiated by the Malaka Project by Indonesian online influencer Ferry Irwandi, successfully raised over Rp10.37 billion in donations within the first 24 hours from more than 87 thousand contributors, with a focus on distribution to remote and isolated areas. On 29 November 2025, Malaysia sent aid in the form of medicine and a medical team which landed in Aceh, which was then integrated with the healthcare efforts of the local government. Support also emerged from the regional sports community in West Sumatra. On 7 December 2025, the 18th Sawahlunto Derby (Bank Nagari Sawahlunto Derby) held at the Kandih Racecourse dedicated its entire revenue from ticket sales and VIP contributions to the humanitarian cause. The event successfully raised Rp32,225,000, which the organizers announced would be converted into basic necessities for flood and landslide victims across West Sumatra.

== See also ==
- Tropical cyclones in 2025
- Weather of 2025
- Tropical cyclones in Malaysia
- Tropical cyclones in Indonesia
- List of disasters in Thailand
- List of tropical cyclones near the Equator
- List of the deadliest tropical cyclones
- List of major power outages
- Tropical cyclones and climate change
