= Maesa Tompaso Racecourse =

Horse racing venue in North Sulawesi, Indonesia

Maesa Tompaso Racecourse Pacuan Kuda Maesa Tompaso
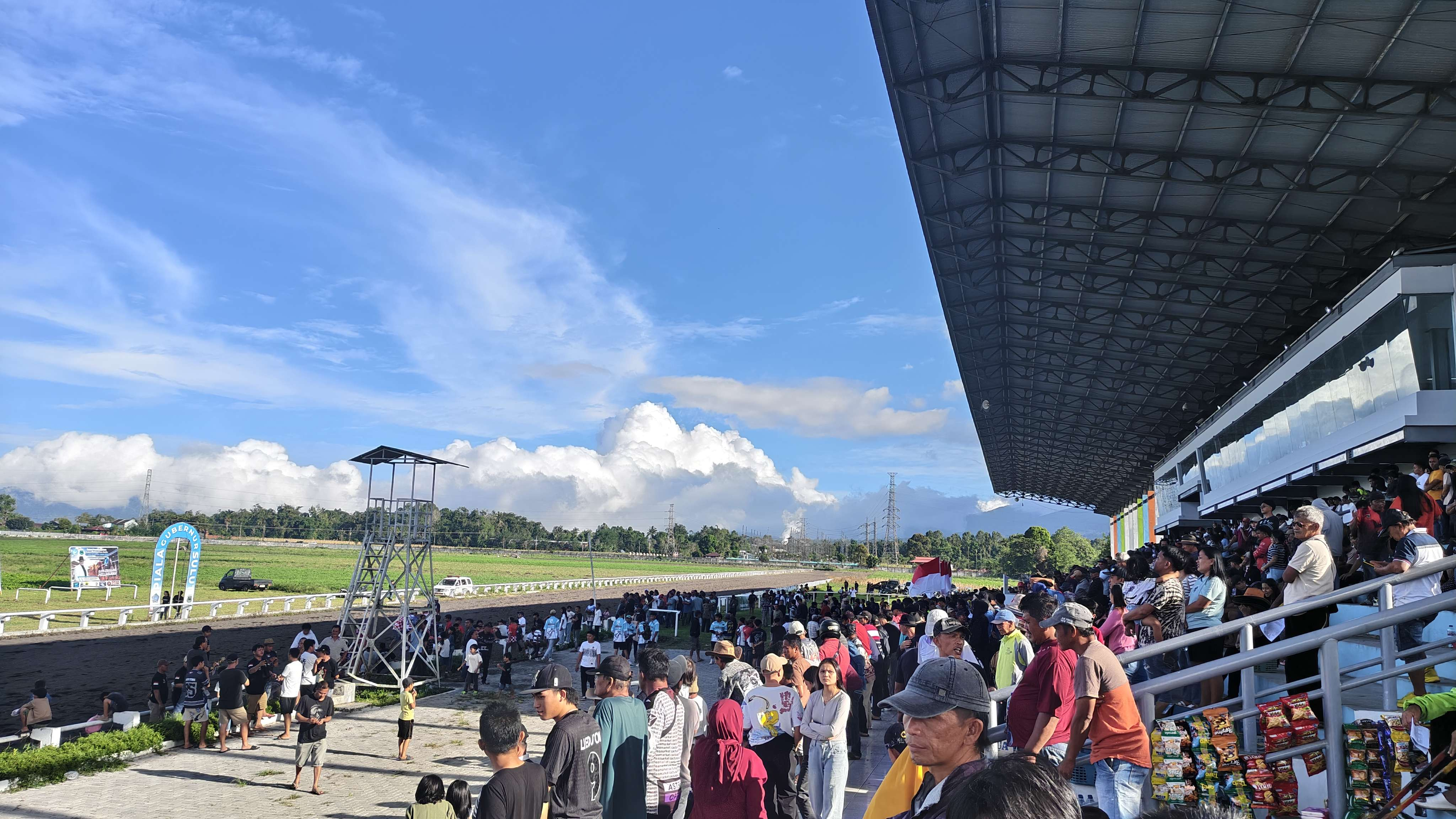
- Interactive map of Maesa Tompaso Racecourse; Pacuan Kuda Maesa Tompaso
- Location: Talikuran, West Tompaso, Minahasa Regency, North Sulawesi, Indonesia
- Coordinates: 1.181880°N 124.796748°E
- Owned by: Government of North Sulawesi
- Operated by: PORDASI North Sulawesi
- Date opened: c. 1967–1968
- Race type: Flat, Harness (bendi kalaper)
- Course type: Dirt
- Notable races: Kejurnas Series

Maesa Tompaso Racecourse (Indonesian: Pacuan Kuda Maesa Tompaso), also Tompaso Racecourse (Pacuan Kuda Tompaso), is a racecourse located in Minahasa Regency, North Sulawesi, Indonesia. This racecourse is known to have hosted prestigious horse racing events in North Sulawesi, such as the National Horse Racing Championship (Kejurnas Kuda Pacu) held by PORDASI.

== History ==
Historically, horse racing is ingrained in the culture of the Minahasans since the Dutch colonial period, particularly in Tompaso. This is evident in the large horse population in five villages in West Tompaso District, Minahasa, which the Tompasoan society's culture is centered around.

Maesa Tompaso Racecourse was inaugurated during the administration of Hein Victor Worang as Governor of North Sulawesi, as part of a broader initiative that opened horse racing venues in several locations across the province between 1967 and 1968. These included Airmadidi, Manado, and Tountimomor, among others. At the time, the tracks were relatively short, generally measuring between 600 and 800 metres, and primarily hosted local races that attracted horses from various parts of North Sulawesi.

In the 1980s, the racecourse was incorporated into a regional tourism development project known as Malesung Boulevard, initiated during the administration of Minahasa Regent Alex Lelengboto. In 1984, the track was expanded to a length of 1,600 meters. During the same period, approximately one hectare of land to the west of the racecourse was acquired as a pilot project for horse breeding.

The racecourse hosted various prestigious races since its establishment, both at regional and national level. It hosted the 2nd series of the Kejurnas in 1997, at which the North Sulawesi contingent secured its third consecutive national championship title. The racecourse also hosted Kejurnas events in 2007, 2014, 2018, and will host the next one in 2026. In addition to horse racing, the venue has been used for other public events, including traditional animal racing such as bull racing, as well as religious gatherings, including an Easter celebration organized by the Christian Evangelical Church in Minahasa.

== Physical attributes ==
Maesa Tompaso Racecourse has an area of approximately 24 hectares with a right-handed dirt track that is roughly 1,600 meters long and 18 meters wide. Facilities within the racecourse include a grandstand, VIP and VVIP room for spectators, a mounting yard, and saddling paddock for caring for the horse. The racecourse is equipped with two starting chutes on the western side of the track. Mount Soputan lies to the southwest and is visible from the racecourse. A small megalithic complex, consisting of a menhir known locally as Watu Tumotowa, along with a waruga (a kind of sarcophagus), is located within the infield of the track.

The racetrack has undergone numerous renovations. In 2014, a major renovation was carried out to prepare for the 2nd series of the Kejurnas in October. The renovations were funded with a budget of approximately 1 billion rupiah by the North Sulawesi Provincial Government through the North Sulawesi Youth and Sports Agency. Another renovation has also been undergone in 2025, with the budget around 2.85 billion rupiahs. However, the renovation attracted public scrutiny after reports that the contractor was alleged to have used construction material that did not meet the technical specifications for the track surface.

== See also ==
- Horse racing in Indonesia
- Tegalwaton Racecourse
- Pulomas Racecourse
