= Sabai Nan Aluih =

Sabai Nan Aluih is folklore that was written by Tulis Sutan Sati. This folklore originated from West Sumatra. Sabai Nan Aluih is the name of Raja Babanding's daughter. She has beautiful face. One day, Raja Nan Panjang sends his guard to Raja Babanding to tell him that Raja Nan Panjang wants to propose Sabai Nan Aluih. Raja Babanding rejects the proposal and challenges Raja Nan Panjang to fight him. Raja Nan Panjang approves that challenge. In that fight, Raja Babanding is killed by Raja Nan Panjang's guard. This incident is known by Sabai Nan Aluih. She kills Raja Nan Panjang as revenge for her father's death.

== See also ==
- Tulis Sutan Sati
- Malin Kundang
- Minangkabau culture
