= Sarga.co =

Indonesian horse racing organizer

PT. Kuda Pacu Indonesia
- Official Logo used since 2023

- Sarga.co's headquarters at Sahid Sudirman Centre, Jakarta
- Company type: Perseroan terbatas
- Industry: Horse racing Equestrianism
- Founded: 2023
- Founder: Aryo Djojohadikusumo
- Headquarters: Sahid Sudirman Centre, Lantai 50, Jl. Jendral Sudirman Kav.86, Jakarta, Indonesia
- Website: sarga.co

PT Kuda Pacu Indonesia, which operates under the name Sarga.co (stylized as SARGA.CO), is a company part of Sarga Group that specializes in organizing, developing, and promoting Indonesia's horse racing industry. The company was established in 2023 by Aryo Djojohadikusumo, the chairman of the Equestrian Association of Indonesia (PORDASI).

Sarga.co, in collaboration with the Equestrian Association of Indonesia, are event organizers as well as promotors for the Indonesia's Horse Racing series. The series includes various historical races, including the Indonesia Derby, the Triple Crown series, the Pertiwi Cup, and the Kejurnas PORDASI races.

== History ==
Sarga.co was founded in 2023 with the intentions of preserving, rebuilding, developing, and popularizing Indonesia's equestrianism industry. In 2023 and 2024, Sarga.co organized several equestrian events in collaboration with the Equestrian Association of Indonesia. These events include horse racing, dressage, eventing, show jumping, and horseback archery.

In 2025, Sarga.co shifted their focus exclusively to horse racing, which, in Indonesia, had been declining in popularity since the fall of Soeharto. Since 2025 Indonesia's national horse racing calendar had been compiled into the Indonesia's Horse Racing series run by Sarga.co in collaboration with the Equestrian Association of Indonesia (PORDASI). The series includes various races and series, including the Jateng Derby, the Triple Crown series, the Indonesia Derby, the Pertiwi Cup, the Kejurnas PORDASI series, as well as the King's Cup series as of 2026.

Sarga.co also founded the Indonesia Rising Stars Award. The awards include the Equine Awards, which awards various achievements made by Indonesian athletes and teams across several equine sports in year, the Sarga IHR Awards, which awards the best horses, jockeyes, trainers, and stables from the previous Indonesia's Horse Racing season, as well as the IHR Badge of Honor, which is given to individuals who own a significant amount of race horses.

== See also ==
- Horse racing in Indonesia
- Indonesia Derby
- Kejurnas Pacuan Kuda PORDASI
- Indonesia's Horse Racing (horse racing series)
- Equestrian Association of Indonesia
