= Tropical cyclones in Malaysia =

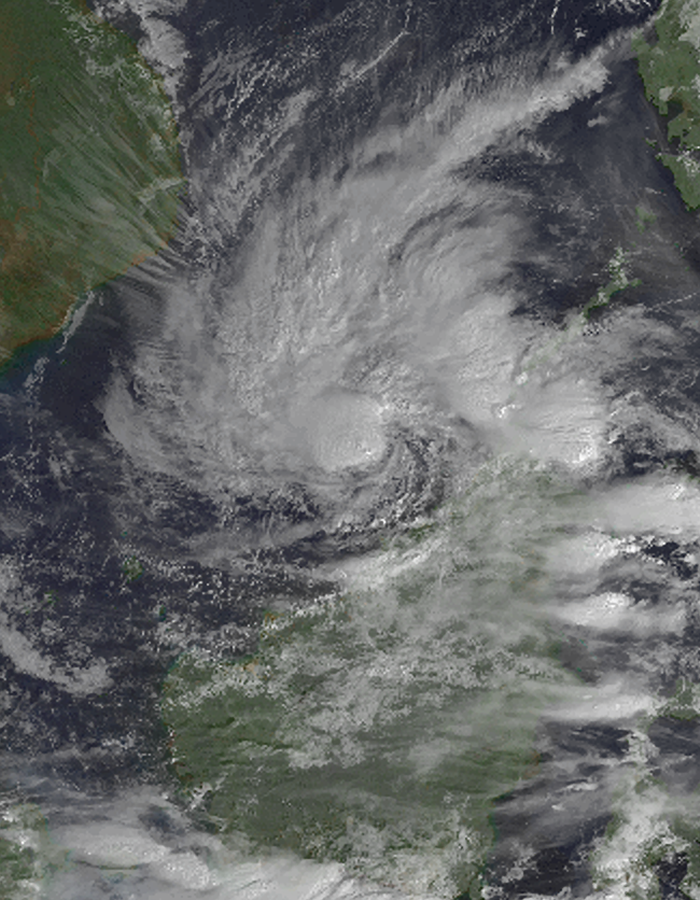
Tropical Depression Greg nearing Sabah in December 1996, one of three known cyclones to make landfall in Malaysia

Malaysia is a country in the southern part of Southeast Asia and is located to the south of the South China Sea. The sea separates two regions which consists of Peninsular Malaysia, located within the Malay Peninsula, and East Malaysia, located within the island of Borneo.

Tropical cyclone formation in this area is unusual due to its low latitude and close proximity to the equator, along with the lacking of the Coriolis effect. However, there have been a handful of storms that affected the nation that originated either from the South China Sea or as far back as the Philippine Sea. This would demonstrate that only two tropical storm-strength cyclones so far have actually made landfall over mainland Malaysia – Greg (1996) and Vamei (2001). Storms that affect this area tend to be around the end of the year, during the months of November and December.

Any storms that have affected the nation, which would also include nearby areas such as the Malay Peninsula (which includes Southern Thailand and the southern tip of Myanmar), Singapore, Brunei or Borneo are listed here.

== List of cyclones ==
- 2 November 1989 — Typhoon Gay affected the northern part of Peninsular Malaysia. The typhoon made landfall over Southern Thailand as a Category 3-equivalent typhoon the next day.
- 26 December 1996 — Tropical Depression Greg moved over the state of Sabah. Flash flooding caused many landslides in the state, killing a total of 238 people – making it the deadliest storm to affect Malaysia. Most of these deaths came from the city of Kota Kinabalu.
- 12 December 1998 — Tropical Storm Gil neared the northern part of Peninsular Malaysia.
- 6 January 1999 — Tropical Depression Hilda brought heavy rain to the state of Sabah. The rain caused flooding and mudslides, resulting in the death of five people, and damages of about 15 million MYR (US$1.3 million).
- 27 December 2001 — Tropical Storm Vamei made landfall over the extreme southeastern part of Peninsular Malaysia, to the northeast of Singapore. Rainfall reached over 200 mm (8 in) in Senai. A landslide also killed five people in total.
- 25 November 2004 — Tropical Storm Muifa brought heavy rainfall over much of Peninsular Malaysia, as it made landfall just to the north of it.
- 27 June 2006 — Despite nowhere near the country, the outer rain bands of Tropical Storm Jelawat pulled in moisture which brought heavy rainfall over East Malaysia, killing 7 people. The city of Kampung Bundu in Sabah experienced a 16-hour rainfall of 8.6 inches (220 mm), making it the wettest tropical cyclone Malaysia has experienced.
- 1 November 2010 — a tropical depression, which later became Cyclone Jal, moved over the Malay Peninsula and brought heavy rainfall. The system contributed in further damages of the 2010 North Malaysian floods.
- 9 January 2013 — Tropical Storm Sonamu neared the coast of the state of Sarawak, bringing light rainfall. It is said that the storm caused unprecedented panic to residents living in the coastal areas of Malay Peninsula due to a similar pronunciation of tsunami.
- 19 November 2013 — a tropical depression that would become Cyclone Lehar moved over the northern part of the Malay Peninsula.
- 6 November 2017 — Tropical Depression 29W meandered over the Malay Peninsula and brought unusually heavy rains which killed 7 people.
- 20 November 2018 — Tropical Depression Toraji made landfall over the Malay Peninsula before dissipating.
- 3 January 2019 — Tropical Storm Pabuk affected the western region of Malaysia despite making landfall over Southern Thailand. One person died from the storm as they drowned due to flooding.
- 17 December 2021 — Tropical Depression 29W made landfall in the state of Pahang in Peninsular Malaysia.
- 25 to 28 November 2025 — Cyclone Senyar produced catastrophic flooding over Peninsular Malaysia.

== See also ==
- Typhoon
- List of equatorial tropical cyclones
- 2026 Pacific typhoon season
