= Kandih Racecourse =

Horse racing venue in Sawahlunto, Indonesia

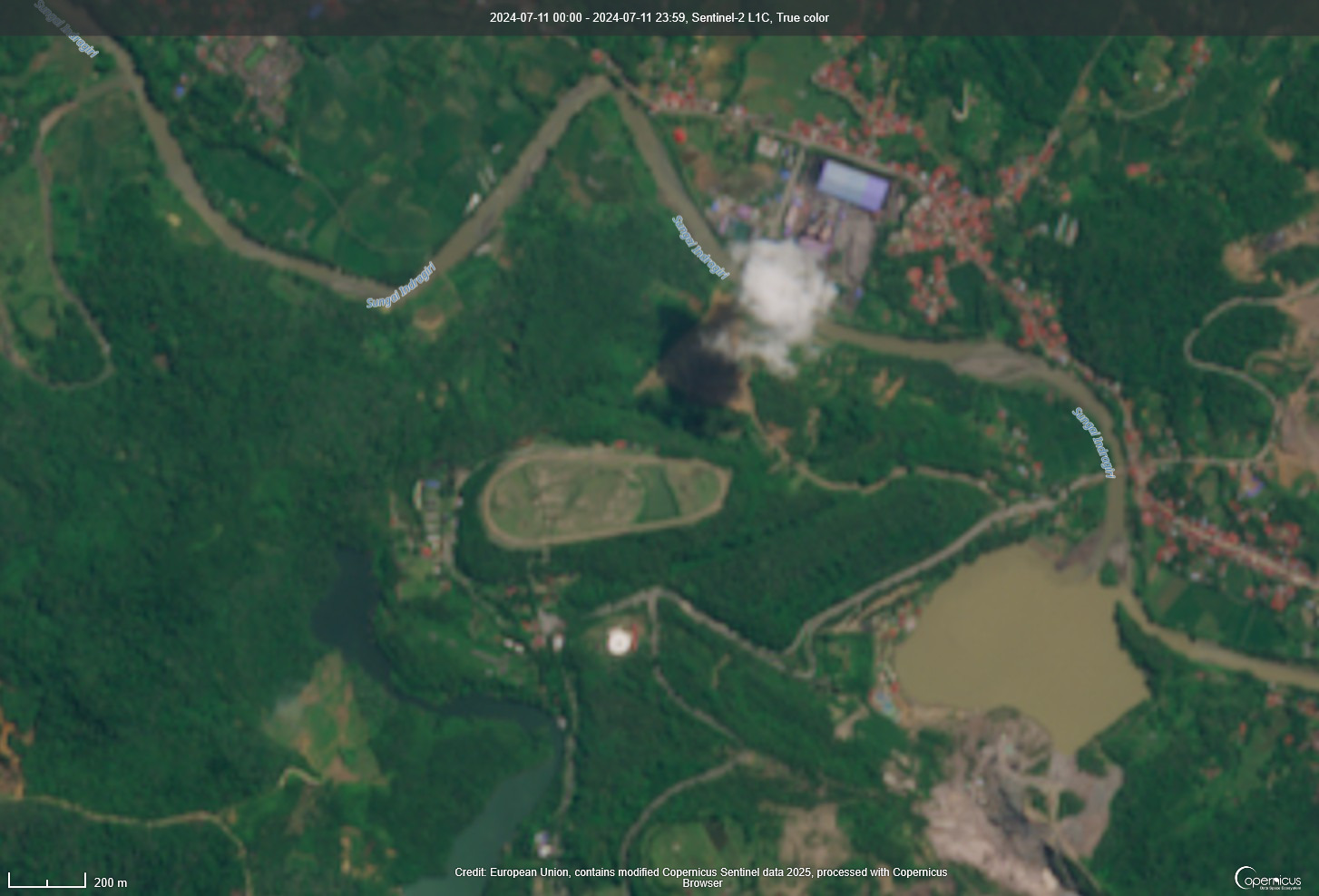
- Kandih Racecourse Satellite Imagery
- Interactive map of Kandih Racecourse
- Location: Barangin District, Sawahlunto, West Sumatra, Indonesia
- Coordinates: 0.6142665°S 100.7490571°E
- Owned by: Sawahlunto City Government
- Operated by: Ministry of Youth and Sports (current); PT Wahana Wisata Sawahlunto (formerly)
- Date opened: June 9, 2006
- Race type: Flat Racing
- Course type: Sand (Pasir)
- Notable races: Indonesia Derby; Sawahlunto Derby
- Attendance: 30.000+

The Kandih Racecourse (Indonesian: Gelanggang Pacuan Kuda Kandih) is a horse racing venue located in the Barangin District of Sawahlunto, West Sumatra, Indonesia. The facility spans 39.69 hectares and is notable for being constructed on a reclaimed open-pit coal mine formerly operated by the state-owned enterprise PT Bukit Asam.

It is part of the larger Kandi Tourism Area, developed in the early 2000s to shift the city's economic focus from coal extraction to tourism. Hosting the annual Sawahlunto Derby and serving as the Pre-Qualification venue for the 2024 National Sports Week (PON XXI).

== History and legacy ==
=== Geological background and mining ===
The site sits atop the Ombilin Coal Mine, a geological formation discovered in 1868 by Dutch geologist W.H. de Greve. For over a century, the area functioned as an extraction zone for high-quality anthracite and bituminous coal. By the late 1990s, accessible coal reserves in the Kandi sector were nearing exhaustion, leaving the area designated as "Critical Land" (Lahan Kritis) due to soil instability and environmental degradation.

=== Reclamation and development ===
In the early 2000s, under the administration of Mayor Amran Nur, the city initiated a master plan to transform post-mining brownfields into tourism assets. In 2004, PT Bukit Asam signed a transfer agreement (Surat Kesepakatan No. 06/08.04/2400000002/XI-2004) ceding the land to the Sawahlunto City Government. PT Bukit Asam provided a reclamation fund of Rp 1.28 billion, which was utilized for earthworks, re-contouring the mining void, and compacting the loose overburden to create a stable foundation for the track.

To mitigate environmental issues such as erosion and heat, a "Green Ring" of vegetation, consisting of Acacia mangium, mahogany, and trembesi trees, was planted around the facility. Drainage was engineered to flow into Lake Tandikek, a body of water formed by a separate mining void.

== Infrastructure ==
The Kandih Racecourse has a track length of 1,400 meters and a width of 20 meters, at an elevation of 300 meters above sea level covering an area of 39.69 hectares. Located in the northern part of the Kandih Resort area, it meets national standards. Currently available supporting facilities include a VVIP grandstand with a capacity of 300 spectators, a VIP grandstand with a capacity of 500 spectators, and a public grandstand with a capacity of over 30,000 spectators.

The racecourse also provides horse stable with a capacity of 200 horses, two judges' and stewards' towers. Other supporting facilities such as a prayer room, restrooms, cafeteria, and permanent and non-permanent parking areas.

== Events ==
=== Sawahlunto Derby ===
The venue hosts the annual Sawahlunto Derby, typically held in December to commemorate the city's anniversary. Sponsored by regional entities such as Bank Nagari, the race attracts stable entries from across Sumatra and Java.

=== National Championship and PON Qualification ===
In 2023, the Indonesian Equestrian Sports Association (PORDASI) selected Kandih to host Series I and II of the 57th National Championship (Kejurnas). This event functioned as the Pre-Qualification (Pra-PON) for the 2024 National Sports Week. The selection of Kandih over other regional tracks was attributed to its technical compliance with national distance standards.

== Management and issues ==
=== Governance ===
The management of the racecourse has shifted between models of governance. In 2009, the city established a regionally owned enterprise (BUMD), PT Wahana Wisata Sawahlunto, to manage the Kandi complex commercially. Due to high operational overheads, management was subsequently returned to the direct control of the Department of Tourism, Youth, and Sports (Dinas Pariwisata Pemuda dan Olahraga), funded by the Regional Budget (APBD).

=== Land disputes ===
In 2019, a legal dispute arose regarding land ownership. The case, registered as Number 12/G/2019/PTUN.PDG at the Padang State Administrative Court, involved a lawsuit filed by the state-owned mining company PT Bukit Asam against the Head of the Sawahlunto City Land Office. During the proceedings, witnesses from the Sawahlunto City Government testified that private development permits in the area had been rejected because the land remained designated as a city-managed asset following the 2004 handover.

In 2024, Reports indicate approximately 500 overlapping land certificates issued by the National Land Agency (ATR/BPN) covering the buffer zones of the racecourse, creating legal uncertainty for private investors.

=== 2021 Safety incident ===
In May 2021, a pier at Lake Tandikek, located adjacent to the racecourse within the same Kandi tourism zone, collapsed, resulting in five fatalities. While the incident did not occur on the track itself, it led to a temporary closure of the entire complex and a mandatory safety audit of all infrastructure built on the reclaimed soil.

== See also ==
- Horse racing in Indonesia
- Bukit Ambacang Racecourse — another racecourse located in West Sumatra
