= Tulis Sutan Sati =

Indonesian writer

Tulis Sutan Sati (1898 in Fort de Kock, West Sumatra, Dutch East Indies – 1942) was one of Indonesian prominent writers of the Balai Pustaka Generation.

== List of Novels ==
- Tak Disangka (1923)
- Sengsara Membawa Nikmat (1928)
- Syair Rosina (1933)
- Tjerita Si Umbut Muda (1935)
- Tidak Membalas Guna
- Memutuskan Pertalian (1978)
- Sabai Nan Aluih: story of Minangkabau heritage (1954)

== See also ==
- Indonesian literature
