= Sengsara Membawa Nikmat =

1929 novel by Tulis Sutan Sati

- Author: Tulis Sutan Sati
- Language: Indonesian
- Genre: Novel
- Publisher: Balai Pustaka
- Publication date: 1929
- Publication place: Indonesia
- Media type: Print (hardback & paperback)
- Pages: 192 (3rd printing)
- ISBN: 978-979-407-360-5 (3rd printing)
- OCLC: 26920185

Sengsara Membawa Nikmat (English: Blessing in Disguise) is an Indonesian novel written by Tulis Sutan Sati. It was published in 1929 by Balai Pustaka. It tells the story of Midun, the son of a farmer, who experiences many trials before finally living happily with his new wife. It has been noted as one of Sati's most interesting works.

== Plot ==
Kacak, the conceited nephew of a rich village leader in Padang, is jealous of Midun, the religious and popular son of a poor farmer; Kacak often attempts to goad Midun into fighting him. After Midun saves his wife from drowning, Kacak becomes enraged at the thought that Midun had touched his wife and attacks him. Midun fights back, quickly knocking Kacak out. As a result of his actions, Midun is forced to do tasks for the village leader under Kacak's supervision.

Still enraged at Midun, Kacak hires an assassin to kill him. When the attempt fails, the assassin and Midun are arrested and sent to prison. While in prison, Midun is tortured until he earns a reputation for being a good fighter. He also meets Halimah, who lives with her stepfather, after returning her diamond necklace. After he is released from prison, Midun takes Halimah to find her father in Bogor.

After living with them for two months, Midun attempts to go to Batavia to find work, and leaves Halimah with her father in Bogor. Along the way, he meets the Arab Indonesian Syekh Abdullah, who lends him money; after refusing to pay the high interest or let Abudullah marry Halimah, Midun is arrested. After his release, he saves a Dutch youth being attacked in Pasar Baru. For saving the boy, Midun is granted a job at the police station by the boy's father, the hoofdcommissaris (head commissioner). He then becomes confident enough to go to Bogor to marry Halimah, and takes her to live with him in Batavia.

Midun is later stationed in Padang upon request to the commissioner, after hearing that his father had died. People in his village are very happy to learn that Midun is appointed as Asisten Demang (district head assistant), except for Kacak, who turned pale and nervous when congratulating Midun. Kacak is arrested for embezzlement, and Midun lives happily ever after.

== Themes ==
Sengsara Membawa Nikmat focuses mainly on the story of Midun, taking a realistic view. Unlike the earlier novel Muda Teruna by Muhammad Kasim, part of the story takes place outside of Sumatra.

C. W. Watson notes that Sengsara Membawa Nikmat, similar to Marah Roesli's novel Sitti Nurbaya, reflects Balai Pustaka's "antitraditional stance", which in his opinion required the support of progressive ideas and the condemnation of conservative traditionalism. He points to the two-page passage in the novel where Midun discusses the traditional witch doctors (dukun) with Halimah, indicating that women who go to the dukun for help saving their marriages actually end up destroying them with the extra costs; other acts condemned include the traditional love potions and possible vengeful actions of the dukun. This theme is later continued in Sati's novel Syair Rosina.

Dutch critic of Indonesian literature A. Teeuw notes that the novel's theme is not exclusively Minangkabau, as it is about the conflict between an evil and a good youth, with the good eventually winning.

== Release ==
Sengsara Membawa Nikmat was originally published by Balai Pustaka in 1929. It was adapted into a sinetron (Indonesian soap opera) in 1991. The adaptation was directed by Agus Wijoyono and starred W.D. Mochtar, Septian Dwi Cahyo, and Sandy Nayoan.

Teeuw considers it Sati's most interesting work. He writes that it is capable of immersing the reader in the Minangkabau village life, with its everyday events and natural human reactions.
