= West Sumatra I (electoral district) =

- Sumatera Barat I
- Electoral district constituency for the People's Representative Council
- District: List: Regencies : Dharmasraya; Mentawai Islands; Pesisir Selatan; Sijunjung; Solok; Solok Selatan; Tanah Datar; Cities : Padang; Padang Panjang; Sawahlunto; Solok
- Province: West Sumatra
- Population: 3.157.336 (2023)

Current constituency
- Seats: 8
- Members: Rico Alviano (PKB); Andre Rosiade (Gerindra); Alex Indra Lukman (PDI-P); Zigo Rolanda (Golkar); Lisda Hendrajoni (NasDem); M. Shadiq Pasadigoe (NasDem); Rahmat Saleh (PKS); Athari Gauthi Ardi (PAN)
- Created from: West Sumatra

West Sumatra I (Indonesian: Sumatera Barat I) is an electoral district in Indonesia. The electoral district encompasses most of the southern regions of West Sumatra and the Mentawai Islands, comprising seven regencies and four cities. Since its inception in 2004, this electoral district has sent eight members of the House of Representatives.

== Components ==
- 2004–present: Regencies of Dharmasraya, Mentawai Islands, Pesisir Selatan, Sijunjung, Solok, South Solok and Tanah Datar, cities of Padang, Padang Panjang, Sawahlunto and Solok.

== List of representatives ==
The following list is in alphabetical order. Party with the largest number of members is placed on top of the list.

Election	Member	Party
2004	Aulia Aman Rachman	Golkar
2004	M. Azwir Dainy Tara	Golkar
2004	Dasrul Djabar	Demokrat
2004	Epyardi Asda	PPP
2004	Irwan Prayitno	PKS
2004	Is Anwar	PBR
2004	Nur Syamsi Nurlan	PBB
2004	Patrialis Akbar	PAN
2009	Darizal Basir	Demokrat
2009	Dasrul Djabar	Demokrat
2009	Zulmiar Yanri	Demokrat
2009	Jeffrie Geovanie (2009–12) (Note: Resigned from the party); Poempida Hidayatulloh (2012–14)	Golkar
2009	M. Azwir Dainy Tara	Golkar
2009	Epyardi Asda	PPP
2009	Irwan Prayitno (2009–10) (Note: Resigned to be appointed Governor of West Sumatra); Hermanto (2010–14)	PKS
2009	M. Ichlas El Qudsi	PAN
2014	Alex Indra Lukman	PDI-P
2014	Betti Shadiq Pasadigoe	Golkar
2014	Darizal Basir	Demokrat
2014	Endre Saifoel	NasDem
2014	Epyardi Asda (2014–18) (Note: Resigned from the party); Hasanuddin Abu Samah (2018–19) (Note: Acting member since 31 October 2018)	PPP
2014	Hermanto	PKS
2014	Muhammad Asli Chaidir	PAN
2014	Suir Syam	Gerindra
2019	Andre Rosiade	Gerindra
2019	Suir Syam	Gerindra
2019	Athari Gauthi Ardi	PAN
2019	Muhammad Asli Chaidir	PAN
2019	Darizal Basir	Demokrat
2019	Darul Siska	Golkar
2019	Hermanto	PKS
2019	Lisda Hendrajoni	NasDem
2024	Lisda Hendrajoni	NasDem
2024	M. Shadiq Pasadigoe	NasDem
2024	Alex Indra Lukman	PDIP
2024	Andre Rosiade	Gerindra
2024	Athari Gauthi Ardi	PAN
2024	Rahmat Saleh	PKS
2024	Rico Alviano	PKB
2024	Zigo Rolanda	Golkar

== See also ==
- Central Sumatra
- West Sumatra
- West Sumatra II
- List of Indonesian national electoral districts
