= List of districts of West Sumatra =

The province of the West Sumatra in Indonesia is divided into kabupaten or regencies which in turn are divided administratively into districts or kecamatan. Specially for all West Sumatra districts (kecamatan) with the exception of Mentawai Islands, they are further divided to nagari, each is headed by a wali nagari. According to data from BPS as of 2020, there are 850 nagari.

== Districts ==
The districts of West Sumatra with the regency it falls into are as follows:

- 2 X 11 Kayu Tanam, Padang Pariaman
- Akabiluru, Lima Puluh Kota
- Alam Pauh Duo, Solok Selatan
- Ampek Nagari, Agam
- Aur Birugo Tigo Baleh, Bukittinggi
- Banuhampu, Agam
- Barangin, Sawahlunto
- Basa IV Balai Tapan, Pesisir Selatan
- Baso, Agam
- Batang Anai, Padang Pariaman
- Batang Gasan, Padang Pariaman
- Batang Kapas, Pesisir Selatan
- Batipuh Selatan, Tanah Datar
- Batipuh, Tanah Datar
- Bayang Utara, Pesisir Selatan
- Bayang, Pesisir Selatan
- Bukit Barisan, Lima Puluh Kota
- Bukit Sundi, Solok
- Bungus Teluk Kabung, Padang
- Candung, Agam
- Danau Kembar, Solok
- Guguk Panjang, Bukittinggi
- Guguk, Lima Puluh Kota
- Gunung Mas, Lima Puluh Kota
- Gunung Talang, Solok
- Gunung Tuleh, Pasaman Barat
- Harau, Lima Puluh Kota
- Hiliran Gumanti, Solok
- II Koto, Pasaman
- II.X.XI.VI Lingkung, Padang Pariaman
- III Nagari, Pasaman
- IV Angkat Canduang, Agam
- IV Jurai, Pesisir Selatan
- IV Koto Aur Malintang, Padang Pariaman
- IV Koto, Agam
- IV Nagari, Sawahlunto Sijunjung
- IV Nagari, Sijunjung
- IX Koto Sungai Lasi, Solok
- Junjung Sirih, Solok
- Kamang Baru, Sawahlunto Sijunjung
- Kamang Baru, Sijunjung
- Kamang Magek, Agam
- Kapur IX, Lima Puluh Kota
- Kinali, Pasaman Barat
- Koto Baru, Dharmasraya
- Koto Parik Gadang Diateh, Solok Selatan
- Koto Tangah, Padang
- Koto Tujuh, Sawahlunto Sijunjung
- Koto Tujuh, Sijunjung
- Koto XI Tarusan, Pesisir Selatan
- Kubung, Solok
- Kupitan, Sawahlunto Sijunjung
- Kupitan, Sijunjung
- Kuranji, Padang
- Lareh Sago Halaban, Lima Puluh Kota
- Lembah Gumanti, Solok
- Lembah Melintang, Pasaman Barat
- Lembah Segar, Sawahlunto
- Lembang Jaya, Solok
- Lengayang, Pesisir Selatan
- Lima Kaum, Tanah Datar
- Linggo Sari Baganti, Pesisir Selatan
- Lintau Buo Utara, Tanah Datar
- Lintau Buo, Tanah Datar
- Lubuk Alung, Padang Pariaman
- Lubuk Basung, Agam
- Lubuk Begalung, Padang
- Lubuk Kilangan, Padang
- Lubuk Sikaping, Pasaman
- Lubuk Sikarah, Solok
- Lubuk Tarok, Sawahlunto Sijunjung
- Lubuk Tarok, Sijunjung
- Luhak Nan Duo, Pasaman Barat
- Luhak, Lima Puluh Kota
- Lunang Silaut, Pesisir Selatan
- Mandiangin Koto Selayan, Bukittinggi
- Mapat Tunggul Selatan, Pasaman
- Mapat Tunggul, Pasaman
- Matur, Agam
- Mungka, Lima Puluh Kota
- Nan Sabaris, Padang Pariaman
- Nanggalo, Padang
- Padang Barat, Padang
- Padang Ganting, Tanah Datar
- Padang Panjang Barat, Padang Panjang
- Padang Panjang Timur, Padang Panjang
- Padang Sago, Padang Pariaman
- Padang Selatan, Padang
- Padang Timur, Padang
- Padang Utara, Padang
- Pagai Selatan, Kepulauan Mentawai
- Pagai Utara, Kepulauan Mentawai
- Palembayan, Agam
- Palupuh, Agam
- Pancung Soal, Pesisir Selatan
- Pangkalan Koto Baru, Lima Puluh Kota
- Pantai Cermin, Solok
- Panti, Pasaman
- Pariaman Selatan, Pariaman
- Pariaman Tengah, Pariaman
- Pariaman Utara, Pariaman
- Pariangan, Tanah Datar
- Pasaman, Pasaman Barat
- Patamuan, Padang Pariaman
- Pauh, Padang
- Payakumbuh Barat, Payakumbuh
- Payakumbuh Timur, Payakumbuh
- Payakumbuh Utara, Payakumbuh
- Payakumbuh, Lima Puluh Kota
- Payung Sekaki, Solok
- Pulau Punjung, Dharmasraya
- Rambatan, Tanah Datar
- Ranah Balingka, Pasaman Barat
- Ranah Batahan, Pasaman Barat
- Ranah Pesisir, Pesisir Selatan
- Rao, Pasaman
- Salimpaung, Tanah Datar
- Sangir Balai Janggo, Solok Selatan
- Sangir Batanghari, Solok Selatan
- Sangir Jujuan, Solok Selatan
- Sangir, Solok Selatan
- Sasak Ranah Pesisir, Pasaman Barat
- Sepuluh Koto, Tanah Datar
- Siberut Selatan, Kepulauan Mentawai
- Siberut Utara, Kepulauan Mentawai
- Sijunjung, Sawahlunto Sijunjung
- Sijunjung, Sijunjung
- Silungkang, Sawahlunto
- Sipora, Kepulauan Mentawai
- Sitiung, Dharmasraya
- Situjuh Lima Nagari, Lima Puluh Kota
- Suliki Gunung Mas, Lima Puluh Kota
- Sumpur Kudus, Sawahlunto Sijunjung
- Sumpur Kudus, Sijunjung
- Sungai Aur, Pasaman Barat
- Sungai Beremas, Pasaman Barat
- Sungai Geringging, Padang Pariaman
- Sungai Limau, Padang Pariaman
- Sungai Pagu, Solok Selatan
- Sungai Puar, Agam
- Sungai Rumbai, Dharmasraya
- Sungai Tarab, Tanah Datar
- Sungayang, Tanah Datar
- Sutera, Pesisir Selatan
- Talamau, Pasaman Barat
- Talawi, Sawahlunto
- Tanjung Baru, Tanah Datar
- Tanjung Emas, Tanah Datar
- Tanjung Gadang, Sawahlunto Sijunjung
- Tanjung Gadang, Sijunjung
- Tanjung Harapan, Solok
- Tanjung Mutiara, Agam
- Tanjung Raya, Agam
- Tigo Lurah, Solok
- Tilatang Kamang, Agam
- Ulakan Tapakis, Padang Pariaman
- V Koto Kp Dalam, Padang Pariaman
- V Koto Timur, Padang Pariaman
- VI Lingkung, Padang Pariaman
- VII Koto Sungai Sarik, Padang Pariaman
- X Koto Diatas, Solok
- X Koto Singkarak, Solok

== Nagari ==
| No. | Kabupaten (Regency) | 1980 | 2000 | 2001 | 2002 | 2003 | 2004 | 2005 | 2006 | 2007 | 2008 | 2009 | 2010 | 2011 | 2012 | 2015 | 2017 | 2020 |
|---|---|---|---|---|---|---|---|---|---|---|---|---|---|---|---|---|---|---|
| 1 | Agam | 73 | | | | | | 81 | | 82 | | | | | | | 91 | |
| 2 | Dharmasraya | 13 | | | 15 | 21 | | | | | | 52 | | | | | | |
| 3 | Lima Puluh Kota | 70 | | 71 | 74 | 76 | | | | | | 79 | | | | | 81 | |
| 4 | Padang Pariaman | 43 | | | | | 45 | 46 | | | | | | | 60 | | 103 | |
| 5 | Pasaman | 30 | | | | | | 32 | | | | | | | | 37 | | |
| 6 | Pasaman Barat | 19 | | | | | | | | | | | | | | | | |
| 7 | Pesisir Selatan | 36 | | | | | | 37 | | | | 76 | | 182 | | | | |
| 8 | Sijunjung | 39 | | | 45 | 46 | | | | | 54 | | | 60 | | | | |
| 9 | Solok | 70 | | | 74 | | | | | | | | | | | | | |
| 10 | Solok Selatan | 9 | | | 12 | | | | 29 | 32 | 35 | 38 | 39 | | | 42 | 47 | |
| 11 | Tanah Datar | 75 | | | | | | | | | | | | | | | | |
| Jumlah | | 477 | 477 | 478 | 496 | 505 | 507 | 519 | 536 | 540 | 551 | 627 | 628 | 740 | 754 | 762 | 821 | 821 |
| No. | Kota (City) | 1980 | 2000 | 2001 | 2002 | 2003 | 2004 | 2005 | 2006 | 2007 | 2008 | 2009 | 2010 | 2011 | 2012 | 2015 | 2017 | 2020 |
| 1 | Padang | 10 | | | | | | | | | | | | | | | | |
| 2 | Solok | 1 | | | | | | | | | | | | | | | | |
| 3 | Bukittinggi | 5 | | | | | | | | | | | | | | | | |
| 4 | Sawahlunto | 9 | 10 | | | | | | | | | | | | | | | |
| 5 | Payakumbuh | 7 | | | | | | | | | 10 | | | | | | | |
| 6 | Padang Panjang | 3 | | | | | | | | | | | | | | | | |
| 7 | Pariaman | 9 | | | | | | | | | | | | | | | | |
| Jumlah | | 44 | 45 | 45 | 45 | 45 | 45 | 45 | 45 | 45 | 48 | 48 | 48 | 48 | 48 | 48 | 48 | 48 |
| Total | | 521 | 522 | 523 | 541 | 550 | 552 | 564 | 581 | 585 | 599 | 675 | 676 | 788 | 802 | 807 | 807 | 850 |
