= Bank Indonesia Museum, Padang =

Museum in Padang, West Sumatra, Indonesia

Bank Indonesia Museum
- Museum Bank Indonesia Padang
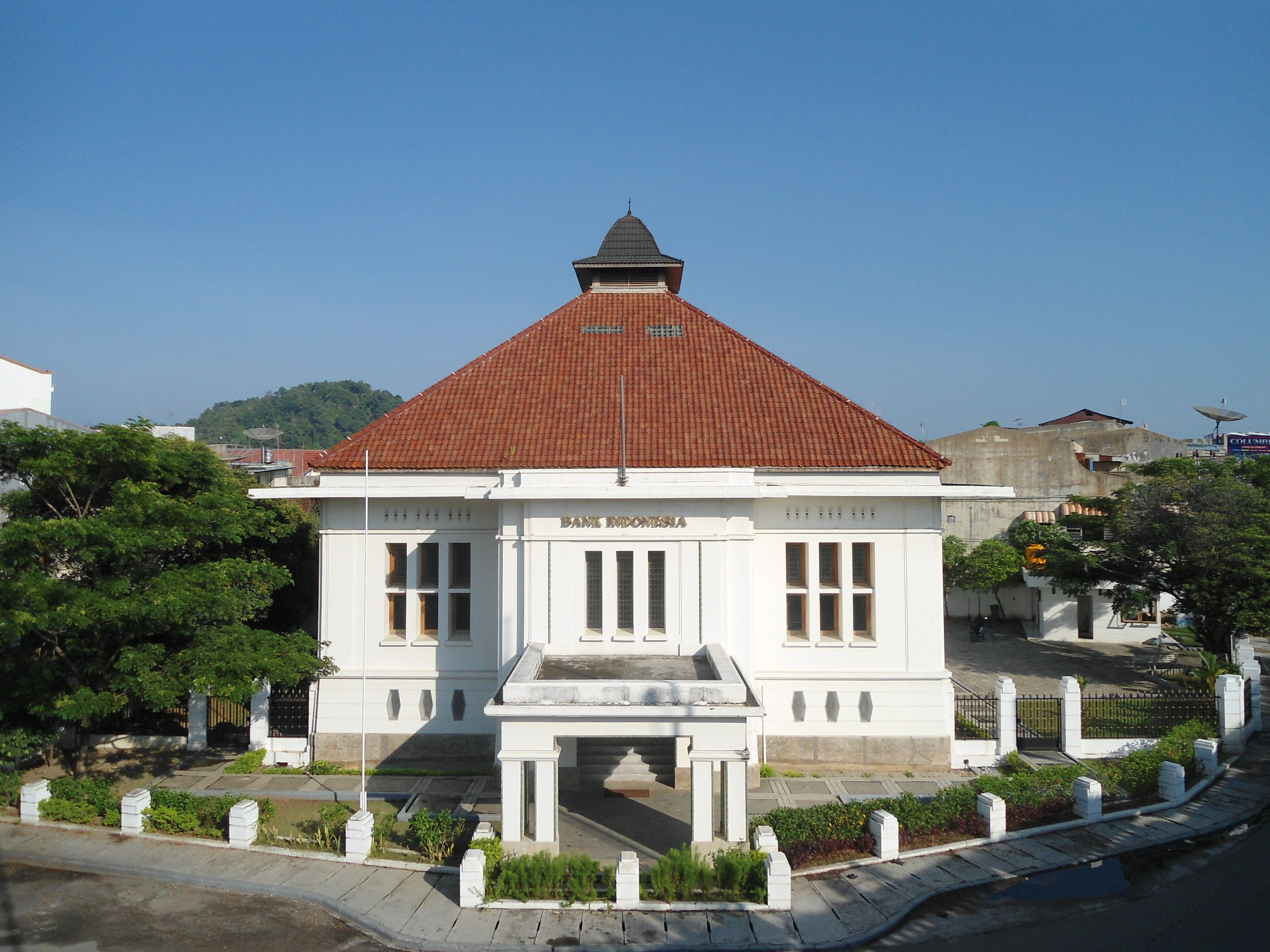
- The Old Bank Indonesia Building seen from the top of Sitti Nurbaya Bridge in June 2013
- Interactive map of the Bank Indonesia Museum area
- Former names: de Javasche Bank

General information
- Architectural style: New Indies Style
- Location: Padang, Indonesia, Jalan Batang Arau, Padang Barat
- Coordinates: 0.964484°S 100.358292°E
- Current tenants: Bank Indonesia
- Construction started: March 31, 1921
- Opened: 1925

Design and construction
- Architect: Hulswit-Fermont-Cuypers

Bank Indonesia Museum of Padang (Indonesian: Museum Bank Indonesia Padang) is a former bank building located in Padang, Indonesia. The building was built on March 31, 1921 as the Padang branch office of De Javasche Bank before it was taken over by Bank Indonesia on July 1, 1953.

Completed in 1925, the building was initially used as the new building for De Javasche Bank, replacing the old de Javasche Bank building at Jalan Nipah, near Padang Beach. The location was formerly the center of the financial offices, commerce and military in colonial Padang. Old colonial buildings from the Dutch East Indies period can still be found lining the waterfront street of Batang Arau.

== History ==
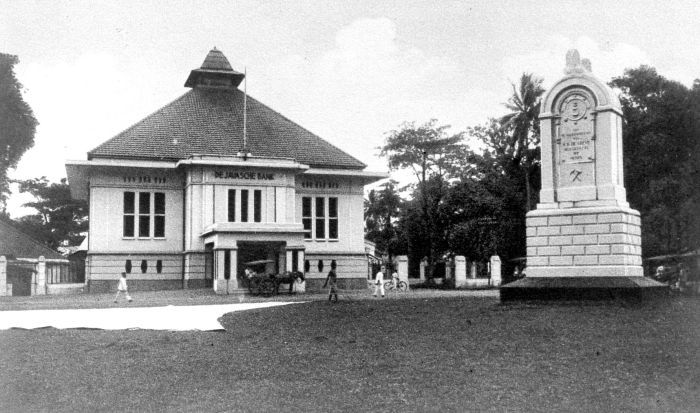
de Javasche Bank Padang in 1931 with the de Greve monument in the foreground.

Padang is one of the great cities of Sumatra. Located on the west coast of Sumatra, Padang evolved into a commercial and military city between the 18th and 19th centuries. In 1864, De Javasche Bank officially opened a branch office in Padang. This was the third branch of de Javasche Bank in the Netherlands Indies after Semarang and Surabaya, and the first outside of Java. The presence of de Javashce Bank branch office in Padang was realized thanks to the request proposal of the Chamber of Commerce and Industry of Padang City to the Central Colonial Government and to the Director of De Javasche Bank in Batavia (now Jakarta). This shows the importance of Padang as the main door of trade and finance in Sumatra.

The first Javasche Bank Building in Padang was located at Jalan Nipah. The building occupied a plot of land which was initially used as military warehouse. De Javasche Bank Padang officially operated from 29 August 1864, with its first director A.W. Verkouteren. In 1912, De Javasche Bank plans to build a new building near the Muara Port. Due to licensing constraints, the construction can only be realized in 1921. At that time the Muara area was planned to be a port area, so buildings unrelated with seaport development were made difficult to obtain permits. On March 31, 1921, construction of the new De Javasche Bank building began.

In 1925 the new building de Javasche Bank was opened. At that time, the governor of the de Javashce Bank was L.J.A Trip. On 1 July 1953, following the independence of Indonesia, de Javasche Bank was taken over by the Indonesian government and was given to Bank Indonesia to become the Bank Indonesia building. The building operated under Bank Indonesia until 1977.

In 1998, the building was designated as one of the cultural heritage of Padang.

== Architecture ==
The design and construction of the building was done by Hulswit-Fermont-Cuypers an architecture and engineering bureau from Batavia with the leading architect Eduard Cuypers in Amsterdam. The building was designed in modern New Indies Style, a style popular in the early 20th-century Netherlands Indies. The building was made earthquake-resistant (including two double columns at the entrance) and designed to withstand high water from Bantang Arau-river (main hall is accessible via a staircase). At the front of the Javasche Bank, there used to be a park de Greve Park with a monument at the center of it. The monument was dedicated to Willem Hendrik de Greve, a late 19th-century Dutch geologists who is known as the discoverer of the coal mine in Sawahlunto. The dock around the area was formerly known as de Grevekade to commemorate the Dutch geologist. Noawadays, the monument and the park has been occupied by the 156 meter Sitti Nurbaya bridge.

== Cited works ==
- Bachyul Jb, Syofiardi (March 13, 2005). "Kota Lama: Grand Old Dutch Matron". The Jakarta Post. Jakarta. Archived from the original on March 10, 2016.
- Febrianti (February 5, 2012). "Menengok Kejayaan Zaman Kolonial di Kota Padang". Tempo.co. Archived from the original on April 6, 2014.
- Suryadi, Surya (December 26, 2010). "Gedung De Javasche Bank di Padang". Singgalang. Archived from the original on December 20, 2012.
- Suryadi, Surya (14 April 2013). "Kantor Baru De Javasche Bank di Padang". Singgalang. Archived from the original on April 30, 2013.
