= Tansi language =

Mixed language in Indonesia

Tansi
- Tansi Creole
- Bahasa Tansi
- Native to: West Sumatra (Sawahlunto)
- Region: Indonesia
- Ethnicity: Tansi people
- Native speakers: few native speakers left
- Language family: Malay-based creole or mixed language: Tansi

Language codes
- ISO 639-3: None (mis)
- Glottolog: None

Tansi language (Bahasa Tansi), also known as Tansi Creole, is a creole or mixed language spoken by a community known as the Tansi people, in Sawahlunto, a former mining town previously under Dutch colonial rule. The Tansi people developed through the use of forced labour from a range of ethnic communities, of which Javanese prisoners were the majority. The community's name comes from the word tansi meaning 'barracks where the labourers lived'.

== History ==
=== Input languages ===
Tansi language began as a polygenetic pidgin language, combining the languages of Minangkabau, Javanese, Chinese, Madurese, Sundanese, Balinese, Buginese, and Batak, with basic Malay and Dutch.

== Artistic practices ==
The Tansi people have developed a performance practice called Tonel, which relies heavily on the Tansi language. Tonel performances incorporate "mimicry and mockery; hybridization; and parody and satire". In the Tonel performances, women reclaimed their identities by acting as main characters in significant roles rather than being used in the colonial period as objects of desire. Within the performances, speakers of the Tansi language illustrate both practices of decreolization towards the source languages of Minangkabau and Javanese, and recreolization illustrating Tansi people solidarity.

== Recognition ==
The mining city where the Tansi language originated, Ombilin Coal Mine, was recognized as a UNESCO World Heritage Site in 2019. The language itself was also recognized by UNESCO as part of the region's intangible cultural heritage.

== See also ==
- Malay trade and creole languages
- Malay language
