= Bidar Alam =

District of Indonesia

- Nagari
- Location of Bidar Alam in Sumatra Bidar Alam (Indonesia)
- Coordinates: 1°24′55″S 101°21′28″E
- Country: Indonesia
- Province: West Sumatra
- Regency: South Solok Regency
- District: Sangir Jujuan

Area
  - Total: 52.36 km^{2} (20.22 sq mi)

Population (2023)
  - Total: 3,747
  - Density: 71.56/km^{2} (185.3/sq mi)
- Time zone: UTC+7 (Western Indonesia Time)

Bidar Alam (Indonesian pronunciation: [ˌbidar ˈ(ʔ)alam]) is a nagari (settlement) in Sangir Jujuan, South Solok Regency, in the Indonesian province of West Sumatra, with a population of over 3,000 people. It is known for being the seat of the Emergency Government of the Republic of Indonesia for a brief period in 1949.

== Geography ==
Bidar Alam is located around 21 km (13 mi) away from the regency seat at Padang Aro. It is one of the five nagari in Sangir Jujuan, and is further subdivided into seven Jorong (neighborhoods). Located within the Barisan Mountains, the Batang Sangir River flows through the village.

== Demographics ==
Bidar Alam has a population of 3,747 in 2023 according to Statistics Indonesia, making up 799 households.

== History ==
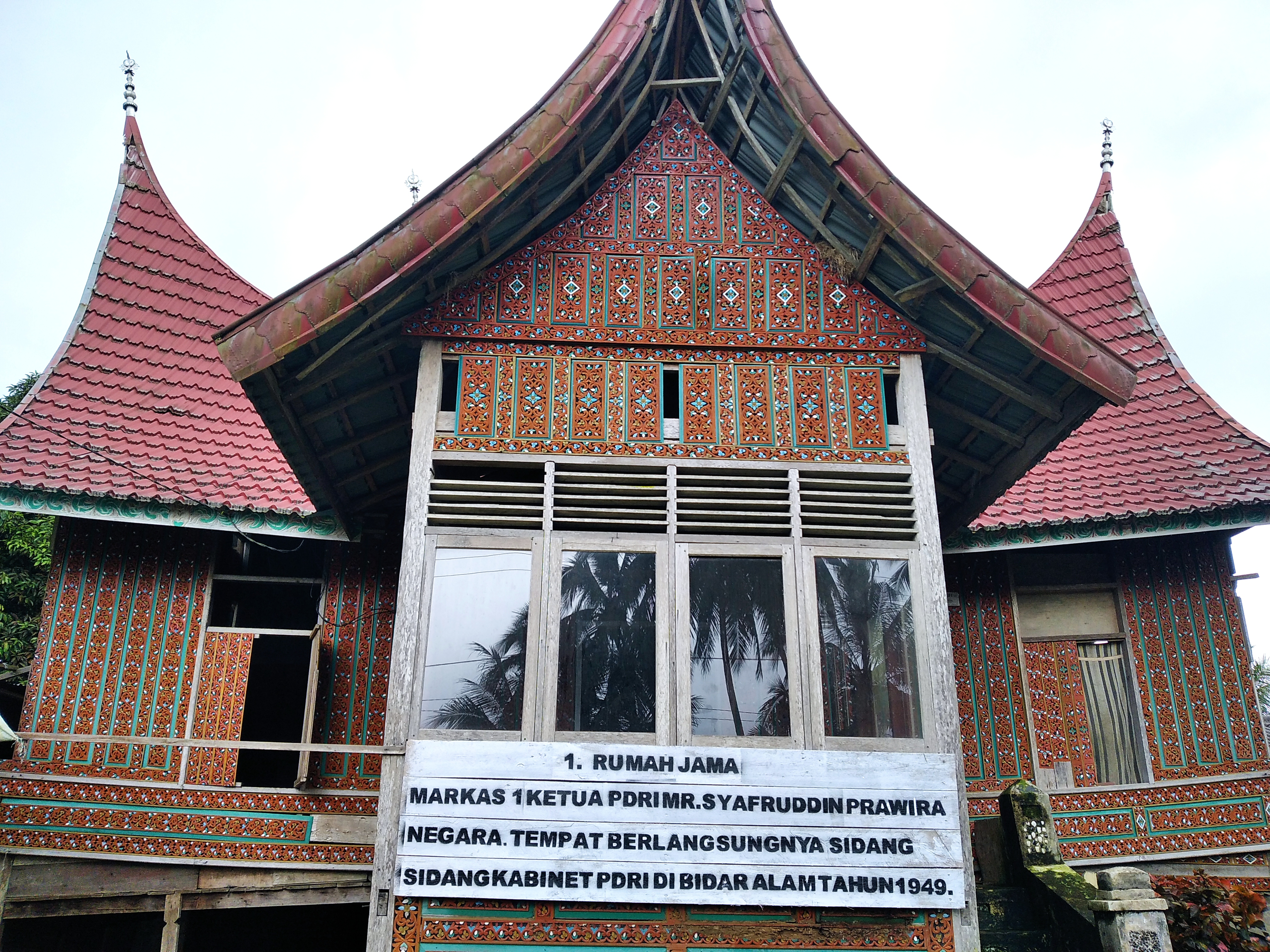
Rumah Jama, the PDRI headquarters in Bidar Alam

In late 1948 and early 1949, the Emergency Government of the Republic of Indonesia (PDRI) moved inland to evade Dutch pursuit, initially from the city of Bukittinggi, then to Payakumbuh, before leaving urban settlements. By 9 January 1949, one of the groups, led by PDRI head Sjafruddin Prawiranegara, had reached Bidar Alam and shelved plans to advance further towards Pekanbaru due to Dutch advances. The local population was generally supportive of the PDRI and provided accommodation and food to the government officials. Supported by Indonesian Air Force personnel, PDRI established a mobile radio station at the town to communicate with the outside world. One villager's house (today known as Jama's House) was used by Sjafruddin, and doubled as the printing location for PDRI's currency.

The relative safety at the village allowed PDRI to communicate with guerrilla fighters in Java and consolidate a provisional government. PDRI remained at Bidar Alam until late April 1949, when they moved once more following the news of negotiations between the Dutch and Indonesians. Compared to the other towns and villages which the PDRI had been based from, Bidar Alam hosted it the longest, for three and a half months. A small monument in the village commemorates PDRI's presence there.

== Economy ==
Rice, coffee and rubber are cultivated in the village. It is accessible by road to the rest of the district and regency, and hosts the sole puskesmas in Sangir Jujuan.

Since 2006, villagers from Bidar Alam have been involved in an agricultural land dispute against the agricultural company PT RAP over an oil palm plantation.
