= Athari Gauthi Ardi =

Indonesian businesswoman and politician

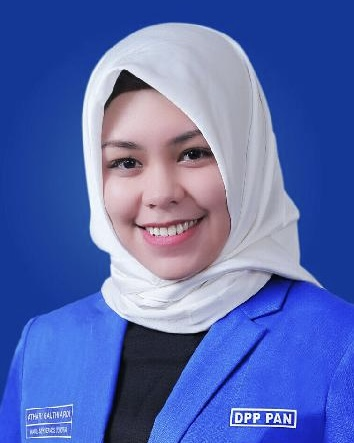
- Official portrait

Member of People's Representative Council
- Incumbent
- Assumed office 1 October 2019
- Constituency: West Sumatra I

Personal details
- Born: 15 April 1991 (age 35) Padang, West Sumatra, Indonesia
- Party: National Mandate Party
- Education: BINUS University; Pelita Harapan University; Bung Karno University; Indonesian Entrepreneur University
- Occupation: Businessperson and politician

Athari Gauthi Ardi (born 15 April 1991) is an Indonesian businesswoman and politician who became a member of the 2019–Present House of Representatives (DPR) of Republic of Indonesia (RI). Additionally, she is the deputy general chair of the Indonesian Cross-Professional Women's Association (PPILIDI) since 2018. Along with her membership in Commission V, she oversees the areas of transportation, infrastructure, Meteorology, Climatology and Geophysics, Disadvantaged Regions and Transmigration (DTT), and Search and Rescue.

== Biography ==
=== Early education ===
Athari's early schooling was received in SMA Negeri 70 Jakarta from 2006 to 2009, SMP Islam Al-Azhar 12 Rawamangun Jakarta from 2003 to 2006, and SD Muhammadiyah 24 Jakarta from 1997 to 2003. She had partially completed his studies at the law departments of Bung Karno University in 2021, Pelita Harapan University in 2020, and Bina Nusantara University from 2011 to 2012. In 2022, she graduated with a Bachelor of Laws from the Indonesian Entrepreneurial University.

=== Political career ===
Athari started her professional career as a Finance and Administration Manager at PT Kaluku Maritima Utama in 2013. She was Director of PT Kaluku Transport Utama in 2015. She ran alongside Epyardi Asda in the 2014 Election for United Development Party members of the DPR RI in the West Sumatra I electoral district. She had not attained success at that point. She ran as a National Mandate Party candidate with serial number 1 for DPR RI members in the same area in the 2019 election.

At the age of 27 on 1 October 2019, she was elected to be a member of the DPR RI for the 2019–2024 term. She joined Nevi Zuairina, Lisda Hendrajoni, and Rezka Oktoberia as the four women from the West Sumatra region who are eligible to serve in the Indonesian House of Representatives. She received a total of 82,982 valid votes in the 2019 election. Several initiatives that Athari hopes to introduce to West Sumatra with success are Community Sanitation (Sanimas), Rural Sanitation (Sanides), Islamic Boarding (Sanitren), and many more.

On 8 August 2022, Athari turned over infrastructure activity support at Sijunjung at the Pancasila Building, Sijunjung. She stated that the result of our cooperation with the West Sumatra DPRD, the Sijunjung Government, and the Sijunjung DPRD is the support of infrastructure activities for Sijunjung Regency in 2022.

In honour of the Youth Pledge, Athari asked everyone to get ready to embrace Indonesia's demographic growth in 2045, which will mark precisely 100 years of the country's independence on 29 October 2023. She asserts that Indonesia's youth need to be ready to act as change agents in the country's growth. Additionally, she urged the people to be mindful of the wave of the productive age since, in Athari's opinion, the demographic growth will have a disastrously opposite effect.

== Political positions ==
Athari demands Palestine's freedom and peace. She believes that the only way to put an end to violence and conflict anywhere in the world is to bring all parties to a respectful peace discussion table. "The world's nations must come to an agreement to put an end to the conflict between Israel and Palestine. The goal of world peace must take precedence above human civilisation," she stated on 16 October 2023.

== Personal life ==
On 15 April 1992, Athari was born in Padang, West Sumatra. Out of six children, she was the first. She lived in Jakarta during his early years and adolescence. She is the eldest child of Epyardi Asda, a politician and businessman who was the Regent of Solok from 2021 to 2024 and a three-term member of the DPR RI from 2004 to 2018.

== Electoral history ==
| Election | Legislative institution | Constituency | Political party | Votes | Results |
|---|---|---|---|---|---|
| 2019 | People's Representative Council of the Republic of Indonesia | West Sumatra I | National Mandate Party | 82,982 | Elected |
| 2024 | People's Representative Council of the Republic of Indonesia | West Sumatra I | National Mandate Party | N/A | Elected |
