= Nevi Zuairina =

Indonesian politician (born 1965)

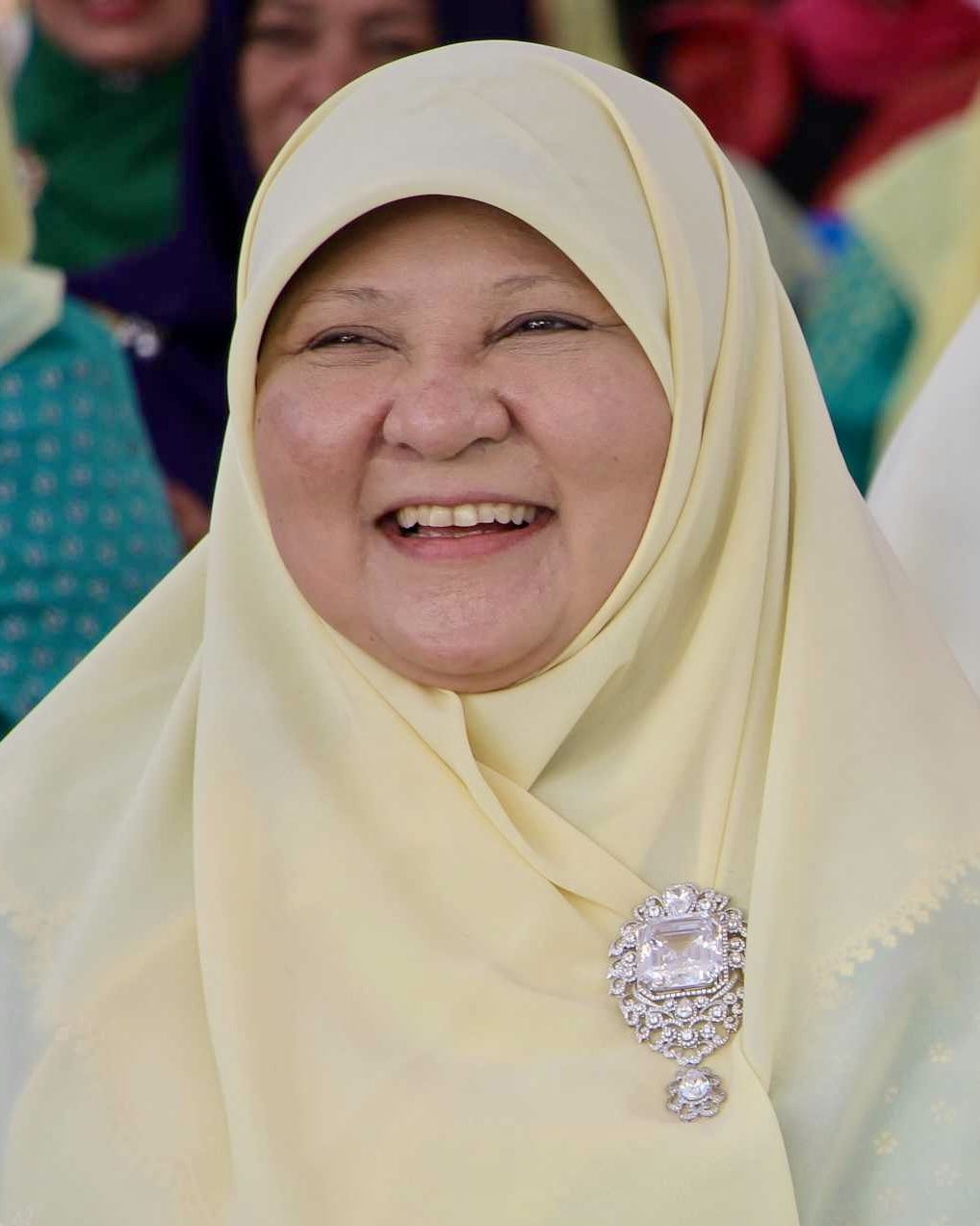
- Nevi in 2017

Member of People's Representative Council
- Incumbent
- Assumed office 1 October 2019
- Constituency: West Sumatra II

Personal details
- Born: Nevi Zuairina; 20 September 1965 (age 61) Jakarta, Indonesia
- Party: Prosperous Justice Party
- Spouse: Irwan Prayitno (m. 1985)
- Education: University of Indonesia
- Occupation: Politician

Nevi Zuairina (born 20 September 1965) is an Indonesian politician who has been a member of the House of Representatives (DPR) since 2019.

== Education ==
Nevi began her education in 1978 at Jakarta's Primary School 01 Pagi Rawamangun. She pursued her studies further, graduating from SLTP Negeri 74 in Jakarta in 1981 and SLTA Negeri 31 in Jakarta in 1984. In 1984, she attended the FMIPA University of Indonesia's Chemistry Department. Nevi herself left school in 1987 without completing her education. Following Irwan's college graduation, they carried on their da'wah endeavors by establishing programs at the campuses of Andalas University and IKIP Padang, which is now known as Padang State University.

== Career ==
=== Political career ===
Nevi received 52,141 votes via the Prosperous Justice Party for the West Sumatra 2 election district, which was enough to elect her as a member of the DPR RI for the 2019–2024 term. She joined Athari Gauthi Ardi, Lisda Hendrajoni, and Rezka Oktoberia as the four women from the West Sumatra region who are eligible to serve in the Indonesian House of Representatives.

On 16 November 2023, Nevi attended the Datuak appointment ceremony in Payakumbuh, a custom with a long history dating back hundreds of years. She reaffirms her commitment to advancing West Sumatra II in her capacity as a regional representative. Her participation in the selection of Datuak to assist neighborhood projects aimed at raising the standard of living for Payakumbuh residents in Batang Tabik.

Later on the 20th, Nevi posed several important queries concerning the operation and efficacy of the Business Competition Supervisory Commission (KPPU) in upholding moral principles and implementing legislation that forbids monopolies, unfair business competition, and monopolistic behaviors. Her statement, solicit the community's opinions and suggestions on this issue. She made this statement during the process of choosing applicants to serve as members of the Business Competition Supervisory Commission (KPPU), where the Fit and Proper Test procedure was taken very seriously.

She was reelected for a second term in the 2024 election with 68,564 votes.

=== Controversy ===
Nevi faced threats of criminal charges for allegedly disseminating campaign materials in schools, a breach of election laws. If proven, she faces a maximum punishment of IDR 24 million and a term of two years in prison. According to the Election Supervisory Agency Limapuluh Kota Regency, there were no election-related criminal charges against the Nevi. According to Yoriza Asra, the local Integrated Law Enforcement made the judgment during the second discussion meeting and declared that it did not satisfy the criminal element. "From the results of the discussion meeting in Gakkumdu, we did not find any election crimes committed by the candidates concerned," he stated on 11 March 2019.

On 15 December 2019, Nevi threatened fellow DPR-RI member Andre Rosiade from West Sumatra for criticising her husband Irwan Prayitno, the governor of West Sumatra, claiming that Andre may have been shot to death by her husband's supporters in a WhatsApp group for DPR-RI members. Despite feeling intimidated, Andre continued to attack Irwan, saying that he went overseas far too frequently. Irwan made it clear that this is only counsel, as Andre was regarded as a sister because Irwan and Nevi have known Andre since 1999. Faldo Maldini, however, asserts that this was merely metaphorical language. Andre met her and Irwan in the West Sumatra Governorate Auditorium in Padang on 18 December 2019.

== Personal life ==
On 20 September 1965, in Jakarta, Nevi was born. Her father, Zulchair Narun, is a retired Ministry of Industry representative who hails from the Jambak Tribe and lives in the Salido region of IV Jurai on the South Coast. Tribal Sepanjang was where her mother, Elbiza Rose, was from in Indarung, Lubuk Kilangan, Padang.

At the age of 20, Nevi wed Irwan Prayitno, a psychology student at the University of Indonesia. She engages in da'wah and participates actively in social and community activities alongside her spouse. Irwan was the governor of West Sumatra from 2010 to 2015 and from 2016 to 2021. She serves as the Head of the West Sumatra Family Welfare Empowerment (TP-PKK) Driving Team, accompanied by her spouse.

== Electoral history ==
Election	To	Constituency	Political party	Votes	Results
2019	House of Representatives	West Sumatra II	Prosperous Justice Party	52,141	Elected
2024	House of Representatives	West Sumatra II	Prosperous Justice Party	68,564	Elected
