= Ombilin Coal Mine =

Mine in Indonesia

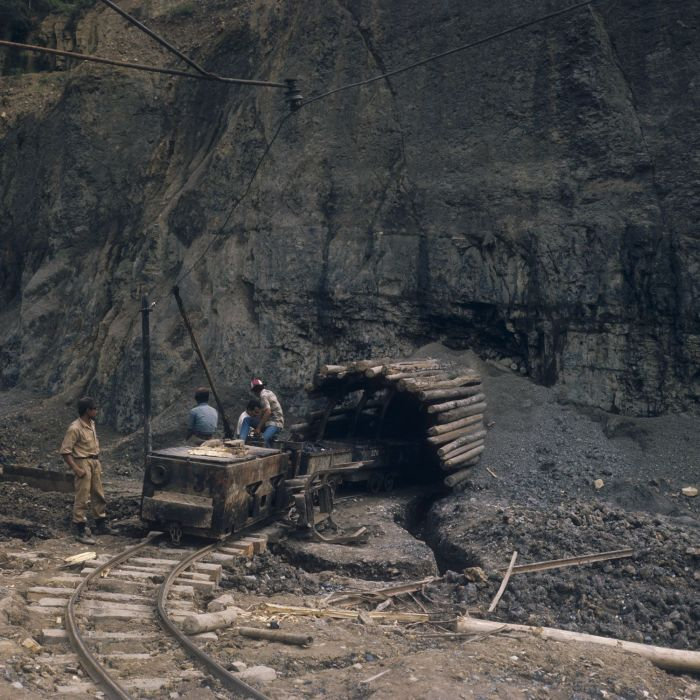
- An entrance to the Ombilin coal mine in 1971

- Location within Indonesia
- Location: West Sumatra, Indonesia; 0°41′S 100°46′E
- Products: Coking coal

UNESCO World Heritage Site
- Official name: Ombilin Coal Mining Heritage of Sawahlunto
- Criteria: Cultural: (ii), (iv)
- Designated: 2019 (43rd session)
- Reference no.: 1610
- Region: Southeast Asia
- Area: 268.18 ha
- Buffer Zone: 7,356.92 ha

The Ombilin Coal Mine (formerly PT Tambang Batubara Ombilin (TBO)) is a coal mine near Sawahlunto, West Sumatra, Indonesia. It is located in a narrow valley along the Bukit Barisan mountains, among the Polan, Pari, and Mato hills, approximately 70 kilometres (43 mi) northeast of Padang. Coal was discovered in the mid-19th century by Willem Hendrik de Greve, and mining began in the area in 1876. The mine is the oldest coal mining site in Southeast Asia.

== History ==
Coal was discovered there by Dutch engineer Willem Hendrik de Greve in 1868. Mining started at the open-pit mine in 1892 after the construction of a railway. In the pre-independence period, coal production peaked in 1930, at more than 620,000 tonnes a year. Prisoners/Kettingganger (Dutch for people in chains) from Java and Sumatra who were transported to the mining site with their legs, hands, and necks chained up, were the main miners. Coal production fulfilled 90 percent of the Dutch East Indies’ energy needs.

In 1942–1945, the mine was controlled by Japan, and the mine declined. From 1945–1958, the mine was managed by the directorate of mining and in 1958–1968, by the bureau of state mining companies. In 1968, it became the Ombilin production unit of the state coal mining company. Production peaked in 1976 at 1,201,846 tonnes per year.

Until 2002 it operated as an open-pit mine. After that, only underground mine continued. In recent times, CNTIC has invested $100 million to the mine. By 2008, the mine had estimated reserves of about 90.3 million tonnes of coking coal, of which 43 million tonnes were mineable. The mine is owned by PT Tambang Batubara Bukit Asam (PTBA) and operated by the China National Technology Import-Export Corporation (CNTIC). The mine produces about 500,000 tonnes of coal per year. As of 2019, PT Bukit Asam coal mine company had halted operations in Ombilin.

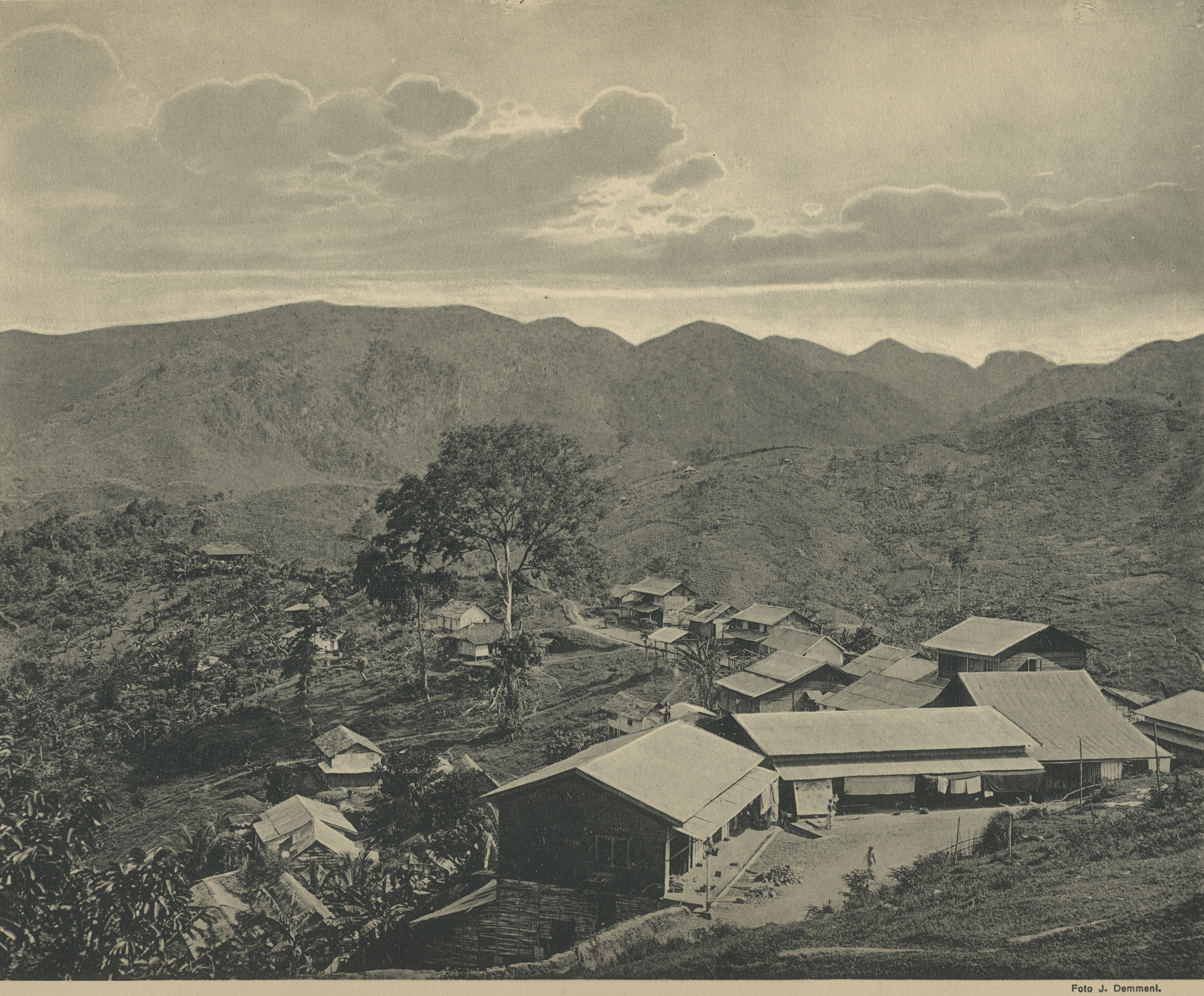
Coalmine Ombilin at Sawahlunto circa 1915.

== Attraction ==
The mining area continues to bring benefits to local residents through reforestation and conversion into a tourist destination. A well maintenance pit with sufficient lighting and air supply attract local and foreign tourists mainly from Malaysia and Singapore. The Ombilin Coal Mining Museum at Ombilin Coal Mine Complex presents the history of the company and the tools that were used for mining. Original relics such as the Mbah Soero tunnel, workers and mine workers housing (Tangsi Baru and Field Land), coal filtering, railway factories, government offices, settlements, municipal government are preserved. The mining site has been transformed into a zoo, lake and horse-riding track.
