= Willem Hendrik de Greve =

Dutch geologist

Willem Hendrik de Greve (15 April 1840 – 22 October 1872) was a Dutch geologist. He was known for his discovery of the coal mine in Sawahlunto, Dutch East Indies (now Indonesia).

== Biography ==
Willem Hendrik de Greve was born in Franeker, Netherlands on April 15, 1840. He received training in mining engineering at the Delft Royal Academy in 1855. After four years, at the age of 19, he earned his mining engineering degree from the academy. De Greve decided to seek employment in the Indies. On December 14, 1861, he was appointed by the Dutch East Indies government to handle various studies of minerals, in accordance with the then Governor-General of the Dutch East Indies van de Beele's decision. Not long afterward, on December 27, 1861, he married E.L.T. Baroness, daughter of the couple W.R. Baron Hoevelinggi and E.J.W. Shutter. From this marriage, he had three children.

=== Career ===
In August 1862, de Greve with his chief of mining Cornelis de Groot began an expedition of various types of mineral deposits in Buitenzorg (now Bogor, West Java). In 1864, de Greve was stationed on the island of Bangka. He managed to push forward the development of tin mining in the area. On May 26, 1867, he was commissioned by the Dutch East Indies Governor Pieter Mijer to conduct another potential mining expedition in the interior of Minangkabau, which de Groot had studied earlier in 1858. In this expedition, de Greve discovered coal deposits totaling 200 million tons on the hills alongside the Batang Ombilin River. De Greve reported his finding to the Dutch East Indies government in Batavia (now Jakarta), and published the Het Ombilien-kolenveld in de Padangsche Bovenlanden en het Transportstelsel op Sumatras Weskust (The Ombilien coalfield in the Padang Highlands and the Transport System on Sumatra West-Coast) together with W.A. Henny in 1871. The publication recommended a railway infrastructure that would transport the coal resource to a port at the eastern coast of Sumatra for the purpose of trade with neighboring countries e.g. Singapore. After this publication, de Greve returned to the Ombilin to further investigate the area.

=== Death ===
On October 22, 1872, he drowned. De Greve was buried in what is now Durian Gadang, Sijunjung Regency, West Sumatra.

== Contribution ==
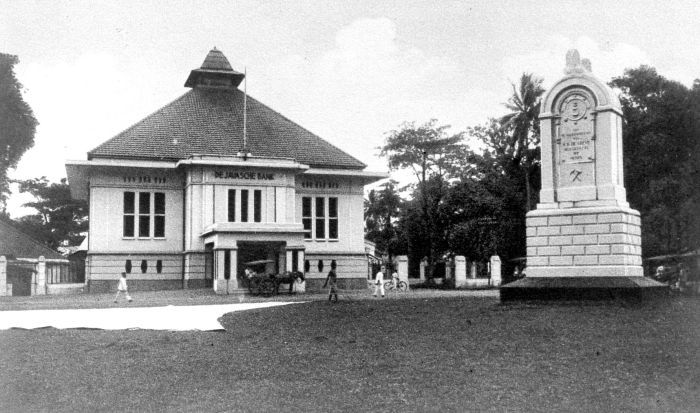
To the right is de Greve Monument in Padang, 1931.

De Greve's research in 1867 in the Padang Highlands had a major impact in the Dutch East Indies government and to the economic development in West Sumatra at the time. The discovery of coal led to booming mining industry in Sawahlunto, forcing the construction caused infrastructures and facilities in Sawahlunto, e.g. roads, buildings, ports, etc. The 100 kilometers Padang-Sawahlunto railway line was built in 1887 and completed in 1894. The line would link Sawahlunto with the port of Emmahaven (now the Port of Teluk Bayur) in Padang, which was constructed in 1892 for the transport of the coal.

In honor of his contributions, the Dutch East Indies government named the park in Padang de Greve Park. In the vicinity, a monument named de Greve Monument was built. Today, the monument has been demolished as a result of the development policy in Padang during the independence period. In addition, one of the docks at the river edge of Batang Arau was also called De Grevekade.

== Cited works ==
- Asoka, Andi (2005). Sawahlunto Dulu, Kini, dan Esok Menyongsong Kota Wisata Tambang Yang Berbudaya. Yogyakarta: Meja Malam Desain Grafis dan Nailil Printika. ISBN 978-979-3723-50-1.
- Azhari Ihsan Yunarco (2014). Penemu Bara Sawahlunto Berkubur di Durian Gadang [Discoverer of Sawahlunto Coal Was Buried at Durian Gadang] (PDF) (18 ed.). Amoghapasa.
- Erni (2016). "Jejak Ir. de Greve Sang Peneliti Muda" [The Path of Ir. de Greve the Young Scientist]. Mak Itam (in Indonesian). Sawahlunto: Government of Sawahlunto.
- Kahin, Audrey (1999). Rebellion to Integration: West Sumatra and the Indonesian Polity, 1926-1998. Amsterdam University Press. ISBN 9789053563953.
- Locher-Scholten, Elsbeth (2004). Sumatran Sultanate and Colonial State: Jambi and the Rise of Dutch Imperialism, 1830-1907. SEAP Publications. ISBN 9780877277361.
- Safwan, Mardanas; Taher, Ishaq; Asnan, Gusti; Syafrizal (1987). Sejarah kota Padang [History of Padang City] (in Indonesian). Jakarta: Departemen Pendidikan dan Kebudayaan, Direktorat Sejarah dan Nilai Tradisional, Proyek Inventarisasi dan Dokumentasi Sejarah Nasional. OCLC 20618655.
- Poley, J.P. (2013). Eroïca: The Quest for Oil in Indonesia (1850-1898). Springer Science & Business Media. ISBN 9789401595681.
