= Lisda Hendrajoni =

Indonesian politician (born 1973)

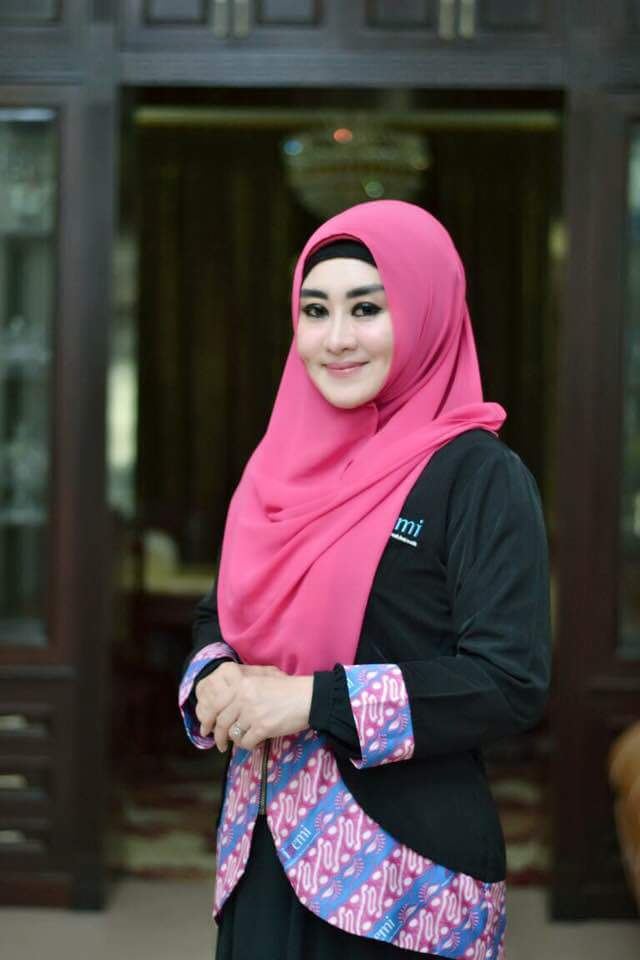
- Lisda in 2018

Member of People's Representative Council
- Incumbent
- Assumed office 1 October 2019
- Constituency: West Sumatra I

Personal details
- Born: Lisdawati Ansori; 19 January 1973 (age 53) Kotabumi, North Lampung, Indonesia
- Party: NasDem Party
- Spouse: Hendrajoni
- Education: Surapati University (BEc); Trisakti Transportation Management College (MM); State University of Padang
- Occupation: Politician

Lisda Hendrajoni (born 19 January 1973) is an Indonesian politician of Minangkabau descent who is a member of the House of Representatives (DPR), serving since 2019. Additionally, she is the chairperson of the Indonesian Muslim Entrepreneurs Association (IPEMI) West Sumatra.

== Education ==
Lisda obtained her early education at SMP Negeri 5 Kotabumi from 1985 to 1988, SMA Negeri 1 Kotabumi from 1988 to 1991, and SD Negeri 2 Tanjung Aman from 1979 to 1985. She graduated from Surapati University's Faculty of Economics in 2005 with a Bachelor of Economics degree. From 2010 to 2012 saw her graduate from Trisakti Transportation Management College with a master's degree in transportation management. Since 2017, she has continued to be registered at Padang State University as an S3 Education student.

== Career ==
=== Early career ===
Lisda worked as a flight attendant for Garuda Indonesia before her husband was appointed regent. In addition, she worked as cabin crew on the presidential aircraft from Susilo Bambang Yudhoyono to B. J. Habibie.

=== Political career ===
On 1 October 2019, Lisda was elected to be a member of the DPR RI for the 2019–2024 term. She joined Nevi Zuairina, Athari Gauthi Ardi, and Rezka Oktoberia as the four women from the West Sumatra region who are eligible to serve in the Indonesian House of Representatives. With 37,326 votes, she has serial number 3, has more votes than any other candidate as of 11 May 2019.

According to Lisda, a number of female politicians who currently hold parliamentary seats at the district, provincial, and national levels demonstrate that women are becoming more electable in the political arena. In support of the idea that women have the ability to pursue politics, she said that there are standards for women's representation in parliament.

Lisda started serving as a resource for the Smart Indonesia Program Education Assistance (PIP) socialising activities. She clarified in her paper on 4 October 2023, that the PIP initiative aid was a government initiative that was given to pupils directly through their individual accounts.

She was reelected for a second term in the 2024 election with 94,553 votes.

== Political positions ==
=== Children's rights ===
Every Indonesian child has the right to thrive, grow, and succeed, according to Lisda. She explained that this is the reason the Draft Law on the Welfare of Mothers and Children was submitted in favour of child laws. "Every child in Indonesia has the right to learn, grow, and succeed. According to Law 1945 Article 28B paragraph 2, the state has guaranteed this right," she remarked. In her view, the realization of children's rights was a manifestation of parents' active efforts to accompany, provide for, and protect their children, thereby securing their future. This was in addition to the positive aspects of children's growth, development, and achievements.

=== Sexual harassment ===
Lisda underlined that the PKS Bill has to be a plague for sexual predators during the discussion of the Bill on the Elimination of Sexual Violence (RUU PKS). The Law on the Elimination of Domestic Violence in Households (PKDRT), the Law on the Eradication of Trafficking in Persons, and the Law on Information and Electronic Transactions (ITE) are just a few examples of the laws and regulations he emphasized the need to clearly regulate in order to avoid undermining the primary goal behind the creation of the PKS Bill.

The Bill on Drug and Food Supervision (POM) was recognised and ratified by her party on 14 November 2023. According to Lisda, the goal of this law's amendment was to strengthen community involvement and empowerment in drug and food control. Moreover, enhancing institutional coordination across sectors and programs and bolstering the role of law enforcement for transgressions and crimes. On the 20th, Lisda expressed gratitude to Gadjah Mada University (UGM) for dismissing Eric Hiariej, a lecturer, after he was found to have harassed a student sexually. She made it clear that sexual harassment of any kind, especially when it takes place on campus, will not be tolerated.

== Personal life ==
On 19 January 1973, Lisda was born in Kotabumi, North Lampung Regency, Lampung. She is the oldest of H. Anshori and Hj. Rachmawati's five children. She is the spouse of Hendrajoni, the Regent of West Sumatra's South Coast from 2016 to 2021. She participated in serving as the Head of the South Coastal Regency's Family Welfare Empowerment Driving Team (TP-PKK) while traveling with her husband.

== Awards and recognitions ==
Throughout her career, she has earned the following awards and honours;

- Srikandi Award (2017)
- Rakyat Merdeka Online's Manusia Bintang (2017)
- Bunda Gender (2017)
- Social Welfare Medal (2018)
- Media Tempo's 50 Most Influential Women in Indonesia (2021)
- PPLIPI's Women's Inspiring Award Politician Category (2021)

== Electoral history ==
Election	Legislative institution	Constituency	Political party	Votes	Results
2019	People's Representative Council of the Republic of Indonesia	West Sumatra I	NasDem Party	37,326	Elected
