= Sangir Jujuan =

District of Indonesia

- District
- Location of Padang Ganting in Sumatra
- Coordinates: 1°26′S 101°22′E
- Country: Indonesia
- Province: West Sumatra
- Regency: South Solok Regency

Area
  - Total: 278.06 km^{2} (107.36 sq mi)

Population (2019)
  - Total: 13,772
  - Density: 49.529/km^{2} (128.28/sq mi)
- Time zone: UTC+7 (Western Indonesia Time)

Sangir Jujuan (Indonesian pronunciation: [ˌsaŋɪr d͡ʒuˈd͡ʒuan]) is a district (kecamatan) of South Solok Regency, in the West Sumatra province of Indonesia. It has a population of around 13,700 people.

It is subdivided into five nagari (villages). It was named after the rivers Batang Sangir and Batang Jujuhan, which used to be the boundaries of the district until the Sangir Balai Janggo district was split off from Sangir Jujuan, removing the district' access to Batang Jujuhan. For a brief period in 1949, the Emergency Government of the Republic of Indonesia had its seat in the nagari of Bidar Alam in Sangir Jujuan.
