= Padang Aro =

Coordinates: 1°32′S 101°16′E

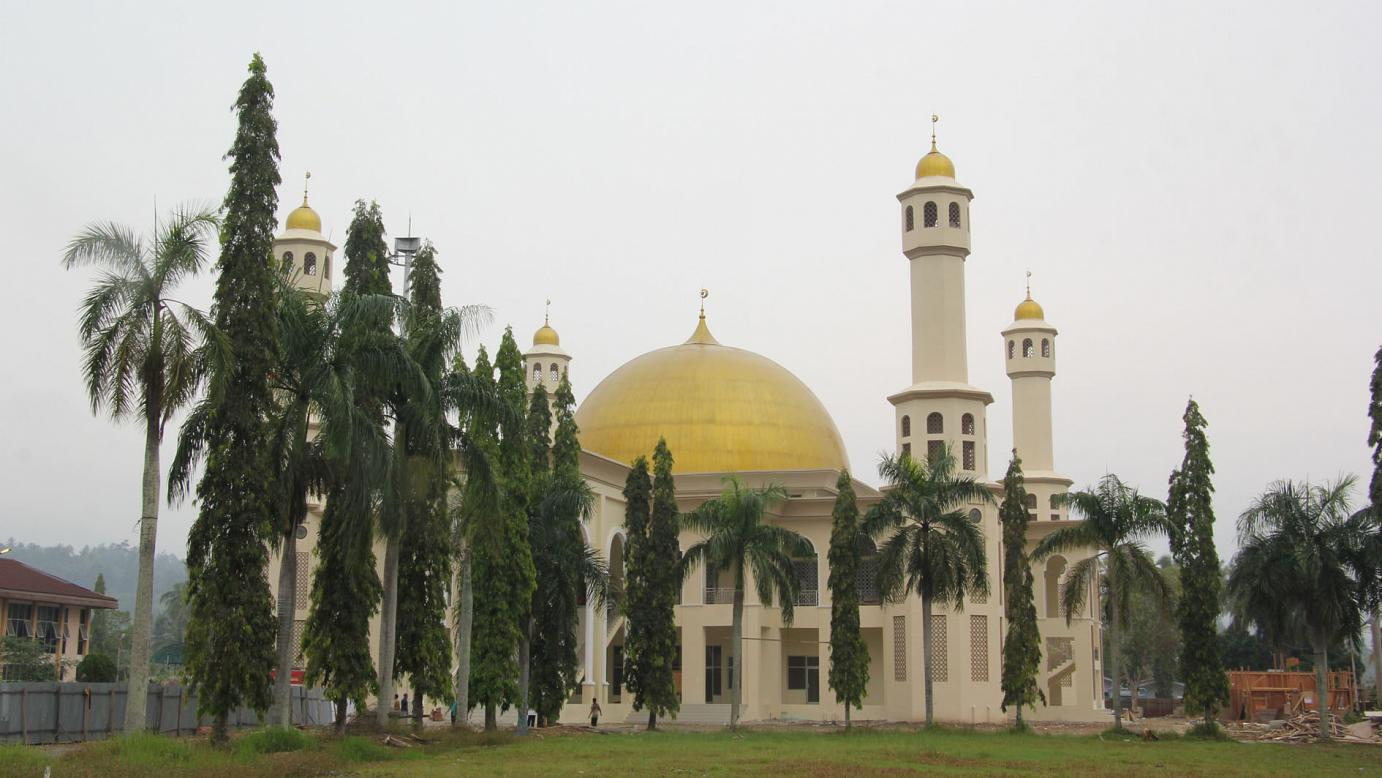
Great mosque of South Solok

Padang Aro is a town and district (kecamatan) in South Solok Regency, of West Sumatra province of Indonesia and it is the seat (administrative capital) of South Solok Regency.
