= Central Sumatra (electoral district) =

Former electoral district in Indonesia (1955–1971)

Central Sumatra Sumatra Tengah
- Former electoral constituency for the House of Representatives
- Province: Central Sumatra
- Population: 3,360,548 (1955)
- Electorate: 1,906,727 (1955)

Former constituency
- Created: 1955
- Abolished: 1971
- Seats: 11 (1955)

Central Sumatra (Indonesian: Sumatra Tengah) was an electoral district (daerah pemilihan) in Indonesia used to elect members of the House of Representatives. It had an electorate of more than 1.9 million people and was allocated 11 seats, with boundaries corresponding to the province of Central Sumatra.

== History ==
In the 1955 elections, the district saw strong results for Muslim parties, particularly Masyumi and the Islamic Education Movement. Meanwhile, the best performing non-religious party was the Communist Party of Indonesia which won a single seat with less than 6% of the vote, narrowly beating out the Indonesian National Party.

== Election results ==
=== 1955 ===
Party	Votes	%	Seats
Masyumi Party	797,692	50.77	6
Islamic Education Movement	351,768	22.39	3
Communist Party of Indonesia	90,513	5.76	1
Islamic Tharikah Unity Party	35,156	2.24	1
Others	296,004	18.84	0
Total	1,571,133	100.00	11
Total votes	1,571,133	–	
Registered voters/turnout	1,906,727	82.40	
Source: General Elections Commission
