= Padang Barat =

West Padang Padang Barat
- Subdistrict
- Interactive map of West Padang
- province: West Sumatera
- city: Padang

Government
  - Camat: Syafruddin, S.Sos

Area
  - Total: 7 km^{2} (2.7 sq mi)

Population
  - Total: 81,625
  - Density: 12,000/km^{2} (30,000/sq mi)
- Time zone: UTC+7

West Padang is a subdistrict (kecamatan) in the city of Padang, West Sumatra, Indonesia. In the administrative area of this district, West Sumatra, the governor's office and the hall town Padang is located.
