= South Solok Regency =

Regency in West Sumatra, Indonesia

South Solok Regency Kabupaten Solok Selatan
- Regency
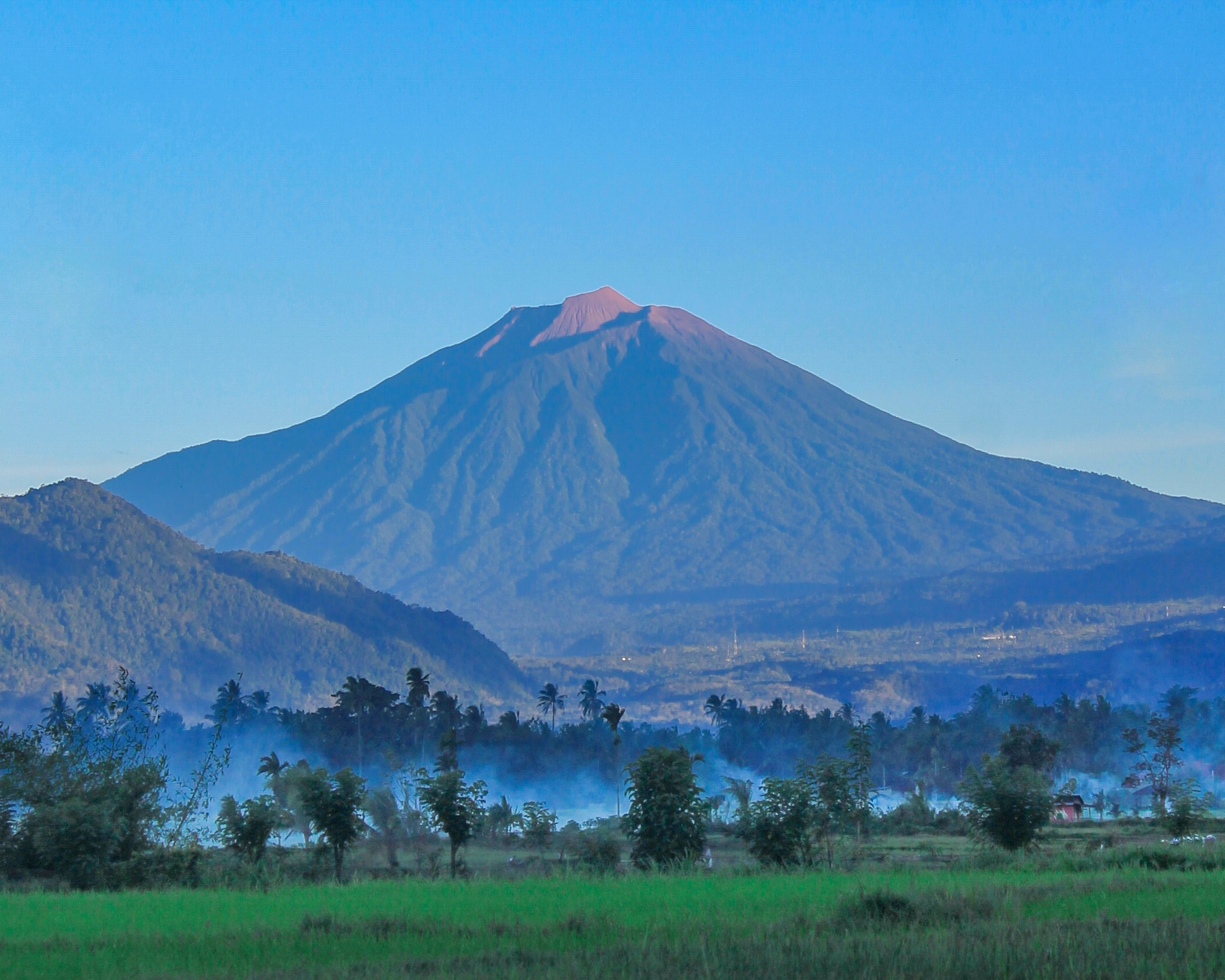
- View of Kerinci Mountain from the village of Muaralabuh

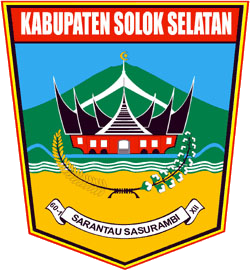
- Coat of arms
- Motto: Sarantau Sasurambi (On a same neighbourhood and same yard)
- Location within West Sumatra

- Location in Sumatra and Indonesia South Solok Regency (Indonesia)
- Coordinates: 1.23333°S 101.417°E
- Country: Indonesia
- Province: West Sumatra
- Regency seat: Padang Aro

Government
  - Regent: Khairunas
  - Vice Regent: Yulian Efi

Area
  - Total: 3,294.39 km^{2} (1,271.97 sq mi)

Population (mid 2025 estimate)
  - Total: 198,510
  - Density: 60.257/km^{2} (156.06/sq mi)
- Time zone: UTC+7 (IWST)
- Area code: (+62) 755
- Website: solselkab.go.id

South Solok Regency (Indonesian: Kabupaten Solok Selatan; pronounced [kabuˌpat̪ɛn ˌsɔlɔʔ səˈlat̪an]) is a landlocked regency (kabupaten) of West Sumatra province, Indonesia. It covers a land area of 3,294.39 km^{2}, and had a population of 144,281 at the 2010 Census and 182,027 at the 2020 Census; the official estimate as of mid 2025 was 198,510 (comprising 100,750 males and 97,760 females). The seat of the administration is the town of Padang Aro.

== Administrative divisions ==
South Solok Regency is divided into seven districts (kecamatan), listed below with their areas and their populations at the 2010 Census and 2020 Census, together with the official estimates as of mid 2025. The table also includes the locations of the district administrative centres, the number of administrative villages (nagari) in each district, and its post code.

Name of District (kecamatan)	Area in km^{2}	Pop'n 2010 Census	Pop'n 2020 Census	Pop'n mid 2025 Estimate	Admin centre	No. of villages (nagari)	Post code
Sangir	647.36	38,216	51,083	57,240	Lubuk Gadang	4	27778
Sangir Jujuan	337.61	11,585	14,331	15,470	Lubuk Malako	5	27773
Sangir Balai Janggo	532.82	15,719	19,482	21,050	Sungai Kunyit	4	27777
Sangir Batang Hari	788.32	13,049	16,291	17,660	Abai	7	27779
Sungai Pagu	313.02	28,279	32,902	34,480	Muara Labuh	11	27774
Pauh Duo	242.65	14,857	19,109	21,020	Pakan Salasa	4	27776
Koto Parik Gadang Diateh	420.36	22,576	28,829	31,600	Pakan Rabaa	4	27775
Totals	3,294.39	144,281	182,027	198,510	Padang Aro	39	

The 39 nagari are divided into 277 sub-villages or hamlets (jorong).
