= Sijunjung Regency =

Regency in West Sumatra, Indonesia

Sijunjung Regency Kabupaten Sijunjung
- Regency
- Sijunjung cultural village

- Coat of arms
- Motto: Di Mana Bumi Dipijak Di Situ Langit Dijunjung (Where the Earth is Stepped on There the Sky is Upheld)
- Location within West Sumatra

- Location in Sumatra and Indonesia Sijunjung Regency (Indonesia)
- Coordinates: 0.700556°S 100.9775°E
- Country: Indonesia
- Province: West Sumatra
- Regency seat: Muaro Sijunjung

Government
  - Regent: Benny Dwifa Yuswir
  - Vice Regent: Iraddatillah

Area
  - Total: 3,150.58 km^{2} (1,216.45 sq mi)

Population (mid 2025 estimate)
  - Total: 249,790
  - Density: 79.284/km^{2} (205.34/sq mi)
- Time zone: UTC+7 (IWST)
- Area code: (+62) 754
- Website: sijunjung.go.id

Sijunjung Regency (Indonesian: Kabupaten Sijunjung; pronounced [kabuˌpat̪ɛn siˈd͡ʒuɲd͡ʒʊŋ]) formerly known as Sawahlunto Sijunjung (Indonesian pronunciation: [sawahˌlun̪t̪o siˈd͡ʒuɲd͡ʒʊŋ]), is an inland regency (kabupaten) in West Sumatra, Indonesia. The Regency covers an area of 3,150.58 km^{2}, and it had a population of 201,823 at the 2010 census and 235,045 at the 2020 Census; the official estimate as of mid 2025 was 249,790 (comprising 126,310 males and 123,480 females). The regency seat is the town of Muaro Sijunjung. The regency was created from the former Sawahlunto Regency, after the districts comprising Sawahlunto town became a city, administratively separated from the regency, which was then renamed.

Most of the people work in trade or as government employees, and the rest are farmers. There are few university graduates because most people are not interested in continuing their studies for reasons of economic and environmental culture. Many of the natural resources of this regency are not explored and utilized because of the mountainous geography.

== Administrative districts ==
The Sijunjung Regency is divided into eight districts (kecamatan), listed below with their areas and populations at the 2010 Census and 2020 Census, together with the official estimates as of mid 2025. The table also includes the locations of the district administrative centres, the number of administrative villages (all classed as nagari except for one desa - Kampung Baru in Kupitan District), and its postcode.

Name of District (kecamatan)	Area in km^{2}	Pop'n 2010 Census	Pop'n 2020 Census	Pop'n mid 2025 Estimate	Admin centre	No. of villages	Post code
Kamang Baru	837.80	41,375	50,459	54,870	Kamang	11	27572
Tanjung Gadang	459.79	22,868	26,900	28,750	Tanjung Gadang	9	27571
Sijunjung (district)	748.00	41,030	47,925	51,040	Sijunjung	9	27554
Lubuk Tarok	187.60	14,125	17,567	18,970	Lubuk Tarok	6	27553
IV Nagari	96.30	14,065	15,584	16,180	Palangki	5	27561
Kupitan	82.01	12,540	13,193	13,360	Padang Sibusuk	4	27564
Koto VII	143.90	32,851	37,549	39,570	Tanjung Ampalu (Limo Koto)	7	27562
Sumpur Kudus	575.90	22,969	25,868	27,070	Kumanis	11	27563
Totals	3,150.58	201,823	235,045	249,790	Muaro Sijunjung	62	
