= Sawahlunto =

City in West Sumatra, Indonesia

- City
- City of Sawahlunto; Kota Sawahlunto

Other transcription(s)
  - Jawi: ساواهلونتو
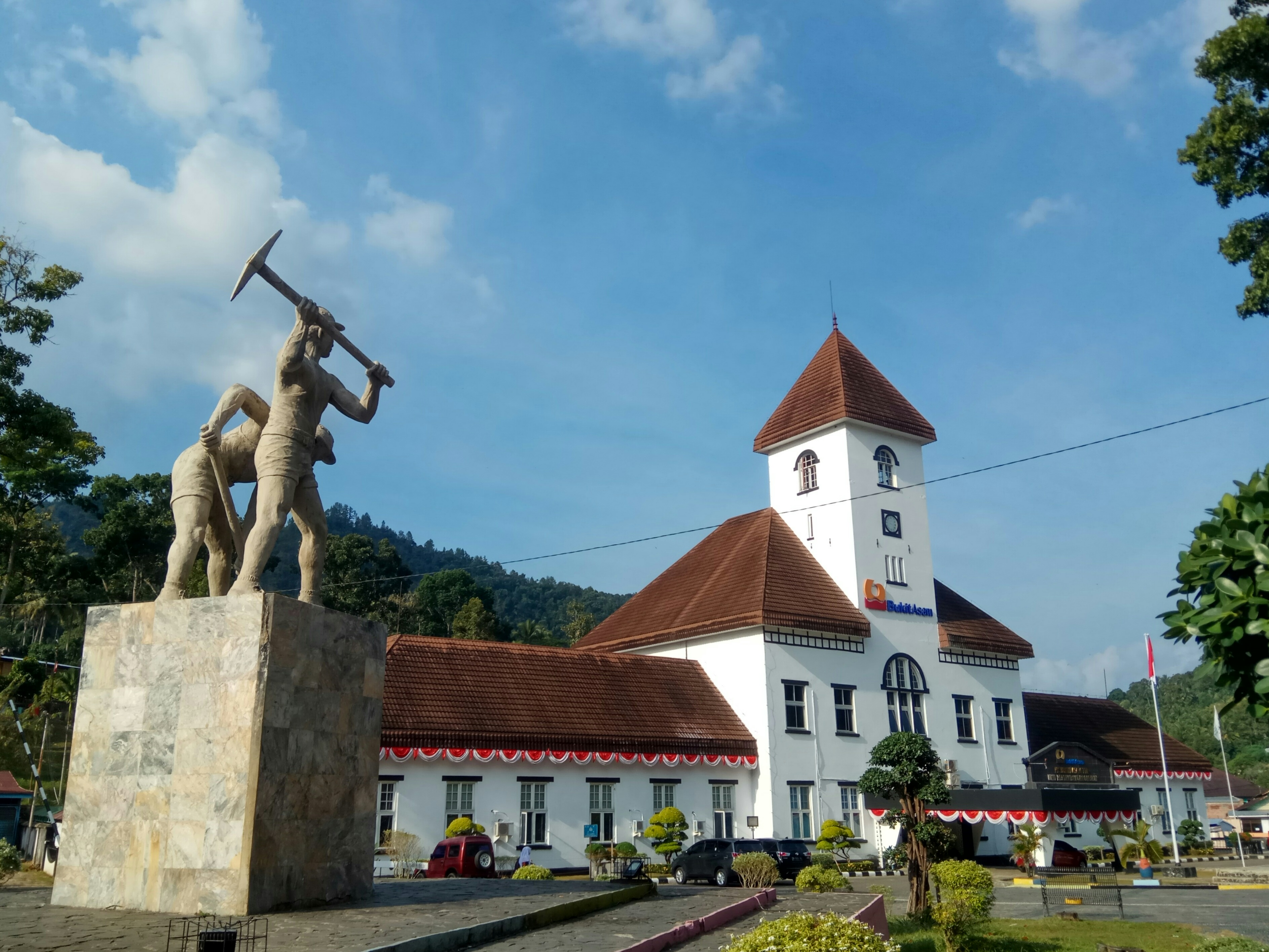
- Bukit Asam Office, a notable landmark of Sawahlunto

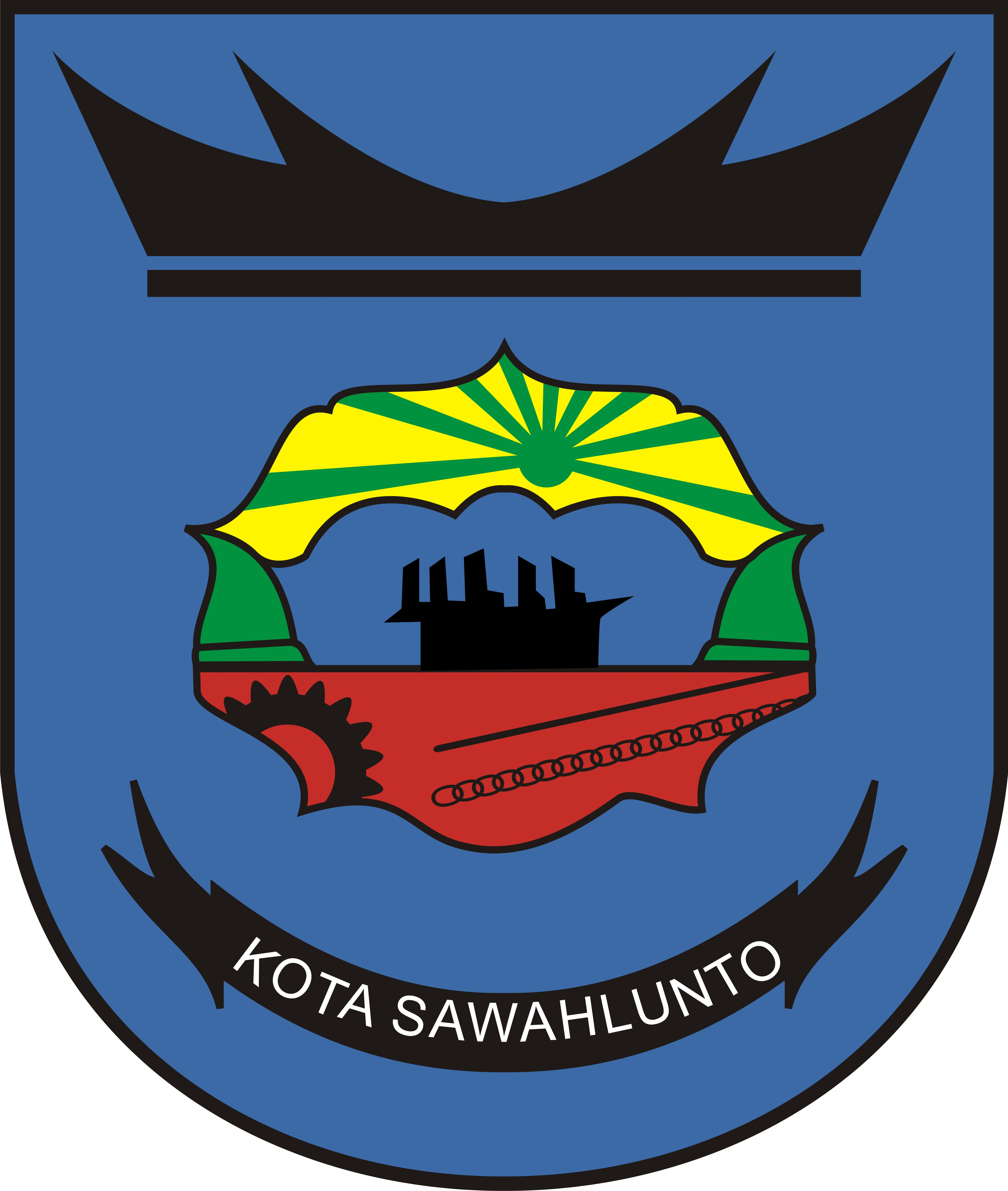
- Coat of arms

- Location within West Sumatra

- Location in Sumatra and Indonesia Sawahlunto (Indonesia)
- Coordinates: 0°40′S 100°47′E
- Country: Indonesia
- Province: West Sumatra
- City Established: 1 December 1888

Government
  - Mayor: Riyanda Putra
  - Vice Mayor: Jeffry Hibatullah

Area
  - Total: 273.45 km^{2} (105.58 sq mi)

Population (mid 2025 estimate)
  - Total: 69,700
  - Density: 255/km^{2} (660/sq mi)
- Time zone: UTC+7 (Indonesia Western Time)
- Area code: (+62) 754
- Climate: Af
- Website: sawahluntokota.go.id

Sawahlunto (Jawi: ساواهلونتو) is a city in West Sumatra, Indonesia. It lies 90 kilometres (a 2-hour drive) from Padang, the provincial capital. Sawahlunto is known as the site for the oldest coal mining site in Southeast Asia. Sawahlunto is geographically located in a narrow valley along the Bukit Barisan mountains and surrounded by several hills, namely Bukit Polan, Bukit Pari, and Bukit Mato. The town has a land area of 273.45 sq. km, and had a population of 56,866 at the 2010 Census, 60,136 at the 2015 Census, and 65,138 at the 2020 Census; the official estimate as of mid 2025 was 69,700 (comprising 35,050 males and 34,640 females).

Sawahlunto is one of the mining towns in West Sumatra. It was first established as a town in 1882 by the Dutch along with coal mining operations. Coal was discovered in the mid-19th century by Ir. de Greve. It was then suggested to the Dutch that coal should be mined in the area because coal was needed for industry and transportation. After the discovery of coal, the area was frequently visited by geologists. Coal mining was pioneered in the area after the eventual "surrender" of the area to the Dutch in 1876. After the golden period of mining and the closure of the mine sites, Sawahlunto became a ghost town and the population declined. In 2004, the city's policy became to turn Sawahlunto into a tourist city, since when the population has increased. In 2014, 29 percent of its income came from tourism, while only 23 percent came from farming.

The Ombilin coal mining site at Sawahlunto has been listed as a UNESCO World Heritage Site in 2019.

== History ==
Coal mining train in Sawahlunto. Circa 1900.

Sawahlunto is one of the many towns located in the area of the Barisan Mountains of West Sumatra, but with a history different from the other towns. Towns such as Bukittinggi, Batusangkar, Payakumbuh, Padang Panjang, and Solok were shaped by the Minang community, while Sawahlunto was created by the mining business during the colonisation of the Dutch in 1888. Coal was discovered in the mid-19th century by Ir. de Greve. It was then suggested to the Dutch that coal should be mined in the area because coal was needed for industry and transportation. After the discovery of coal, the area was frequently visited by geologists. Coal mining was pioneered in the area after the eventual "surrender" of the area to the Dutch in 1876.

Coal mining had significantly changed the rural landscape of Sawahlunto into an industrial site. During its development in the 19th century, mining companies designed the Sawahlunto mining site into five spatial activities: coal mining industry, commercial and trade areas, residential areas, administrative areas, and health utilities. To support its activities, the Netherlands built several transportation networks such as creating a railway network to transport coal from Sawahlunto to the west coast of Sumatra. The Dutch East Indies also built Emmahaven Port (known as Teluk Bayur) which became a shipping port for coal exports, using steamers SS Sawahlunto and SS Ombilin-Nederland. Meanwhile, in 1887–1892, they began building a train from Pulau Air Padang to Muaro Kalaban and from this station to the Sawahlunto area.

- In 1888 the Nederland Indies initialised many coal mining facilities
- In 1894 train tracks were opened
- In 1898 the first coal mining tunnel was built at Air Dingin, Lembah Segar, but was later closed in 1932 and re-opened again in June 2007. Sawahlunto started becoming a residential area for coal miners when the Dutch Indies government invested 5.5 million [gulden] (the Dutch currency at that time) to build various facilities to manage the coal mining industry Ombilin. This residential area continued to expand to become a small town that consisted mainly of officers and coal miners.

The Dutch also built a train system costing 17 million gulden as a mode for coal to be transported out from Sawahlunto through Padang. Trains have been in operation since 1888 but only recently reached Muara Kalaban and later on reaching Sawahlunto in 1894. Having trains as a mode of transport brought in huge profits from the investment from only tens of thousands to hundreds of thousands of tons of coal per year. Losses turned into big profits as much as 4.6 million gulden in a year in 1920. Until 1898, the coal mining business still used forced labour, known as narapaidana, who were forced to work with minimum wage. In 1908 wages for forced labour were 18 cents/day and they were subjected to whips under legal sanctions should they rebel. Wages for contract workers were 32 cents/day and they were entitled to housing facilities and healthcare facilities. Meanwhile, wages for other labourers were 62 cents/day without benefits (Zubir,1995). With that, you can picture Sawahlunto to be a prisoner camp for the forced workers in the early 20th century.

In 1918 Sawahlunto was known as Gemeentelijk Ressort or Gemeente with a land area of 778 ha. The name was given to mark its success in coal mining activities at that time. The total population in 1930 was 43,576 consisting of 564 Europeans. Even though Sawahlunto had yet to become Stadsgemeente, the management of the town was done by Stadsgemeenteraad (DPRD) and Burgemeester (Walikota).

Globally, from 1940 till the end 70s the production of coal by Ombilin declined, and shrank to only tens of thousands of tons per year. Sawahlunto also faced a decline in coal production indicative of the decline in population to only 13,561 inhabitants in 1980. With the increased number of facilities, a change in management, and the application of new technology, the mining industry increased again since the beginning of the 80s. Moreover, production continued to increase even exceeding 1 million tonnes per year in the late 90s. The population in Sawahlunto increased to 15,279 according to the Census in 1990. Even though the population growth rate is only 1.2%, it is still below the annual average population growth rate of Sumatera Barat which reached 1.62% and did not appear correlated with increased production of coal.

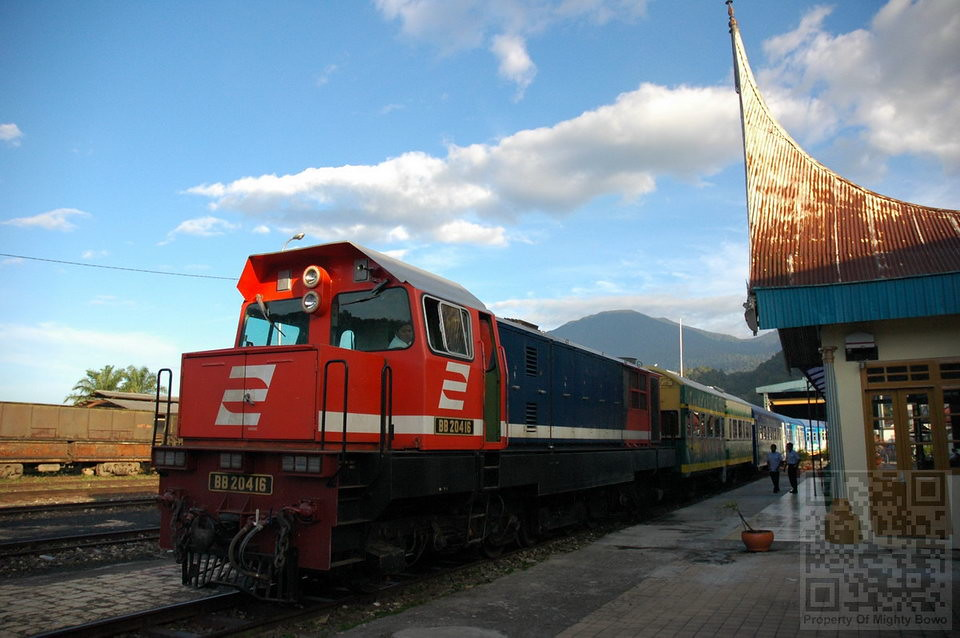
Padang Panjang – Sawahlunto tourism train

On 10 March 1949, a meeting was held between Afdeeling Solok, which is supervised by Sawahlunto/Sijunjung, and Kabupaten Solok, under the governance of Stad Gemeente Sawahlunto, which is under the authority of Bupati Sawahlunto/Sijunjung to discuss on the natural resources gained. In the period 1949–1965, there were changes in the governance of Sawahlunto/Sijunjung. The status of Act No. 18 in 1965 changed to Regional Level II with the title as Kotamadya Sawahlunto commanded by the town, Mayor AKHMAD Noerdin, as of 11 June 1965, with the Decree of the Minister of Home Affairs dated 8 March 1965. The act in Item Number Up 1965. 15/2/13-227 stated the responsibility of the Mayor as the Head of the Regional Sawahlunto.

Mining was initiated in the area after Independence. Activities were undertaken by PT Tambang Batubara Ombilin (TBO). PT TBO was later liquidated and became a subsidiary of PTBA (Bukit Asam) which is located in Southern Sumatra. Since reforms in the region, the area has experienced a growth in the mining community because people felt compelled to participate in coal mining. Coal mining was not restricted within the boundaries of the community but also extended to the land owned by PTBA TPO. The mayor at that time was Ir. Amran Nur, with Erizal Ridwan S.T. as his representative.

== Administrative districts ==
Sawahlunto city consists of four districts (kecamatan), tabulated below with their areas and population totals from the 2010 Census and the 2020 Census, together with the official estimates as of mid 2025. The table also includes the locations of the district administrative centres, the number of administrative villages in each district (totaling 27 rural desa and 10 urban kelurahan), and all their postal codes.

Name of District (kecamatan)	Area in km^{2}	Po'n Census 2010'	Pop'n Census 2020	Pop'n Estimate mid 2025	Admin centre	No. of villages	Post codes
Silungkang	32.93	10,126	11,409	12,110	Muaro Kalaban	5	27431-27435
Lembah Segar	52.58	12,145	13,352	14,000	Aur Mulyo	11 ^{(a)}	27411-27419
Barangin	88.55	16,912	20,284	22,180	Santua	10 ^{(b)}	27421-27427
Talawi	99.39	17,682	20,093	21,410	Talawi Mudiak	11	27441-27449
Totals	273.45	56,866	65,138	69,700	Lembah Segar	37	

Notes: (a) includes 6 kelurahan. (b) includes 4 kelurahan.

== Geography ==
Geographically Sawahlunto is located at 0^{0} 33’ 40" – 0^{0} 43’ 33" South and 100^{0} 43’ 13" – 100^{0} 50’ 40" East, bounded to the north by Tanah Datar Regency, to the east by Sijunjung Regency and the south and west by Solok Regency.

Sawahlunto has a maximum elevation of about 650m above sea level. The landscape is primarily made up of steep hills which act as a hindrance to the development of the town. The old town centre spanned 5.8 km^{2}. Relatively flat lands can be found in the Kecamatan Talawi district. The area that runs from north to south has a relatively steep topography at an angle of elevation of approximately 40%. On the other hand, the northern area is relatively gently sloping. Most developments are located at a height of 100-500m. Development consists of both protected areas (25%) as well as areas set aside for cultivation (73%). This land mainly consists of mixed gardening(34%), thick forest and scrub(19%). 0.2% of the lake was once used for mining.

== Climate ==
Sawahlunto has a tropical rainforest climate (Af) with heavy rainfall year-round.

Climate data for Sawahlunto
Month	Jan	Feb	Mar	Apr	May	Jun	Jul	Aug	Sep	Oct	Nov	Dec	Year
Mean daily maximum °C (°F)	30.1 (86.2)	30.7 (87.3)	30.8 (87.4)	30.8 (87.4)	31.2 (88.2)	30.8 (87.4)	30.5 (86.9)	30.5 (86.9)	30.2 (86.4)	30.1 (86.2)	30.1 (86.2)	29.8 (85.6)	30.5 (86.8)
Daily mean °C (°F)	25.6 (78.1)	26.0 (78.8)	26.1 (79.0)	26.2 (79.2)	26.5 (79.7)	25.9 (78.6)	25.6 (78.1)	25.6 (78.1)	25.7 (78.3)	25.7 (78.3)	25.8 (78.4)	25.5 (77.9)	25.9 (78.5)
Mean daily minimum °C (°F)	21.2 (70.2)	21.3 (70.3)	21.4 (70.5)	21.7 (71.1)	21.8 (71.2)	21.1 (70.0)	20.8 (69.4)	20.8 (69.4)	21.2 (70.2)	21.4 (70.5)	21.5 (70.7)	21.3 (70.3)	21.3 (70.3)
Average rainfall mm (inches)	262 (10.3)	183 (7.2)	238 (9.4)	279 (11.0)	194 (7.6)	132 (5.2)	100 (3.9)	129 (5.1)	172 (6.8)	237 (9.3)	256 (10.1)	259 (10.2)	2,441 (96.1)
Source: Climate-Data.org

== Demographic ==
=== Population ===
As of the 2020 Census, the total population of Sawahlunto stood at around 65,138, consisting of 32,737 males and 32,371 females. In late 2025 the population reached over 70,000.

Their source of income varies from working on farms to mining and service sectors. The economic structure of the people of Sawahlunto is mainly supported by mining. Subsectors consist of agriculture, small industries/handicrafts, and livestock farming.

With the expansion of the district based on government law No.44, 1990 Sawahlunto became known not only for handicrafts, snacks, livestock, and fruits but also as a tourist destination.

=== Religion ===
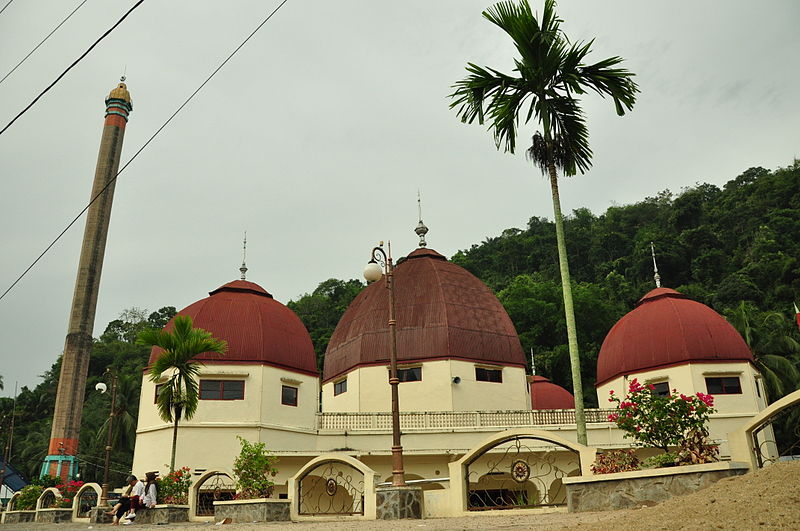
Grand Mosque of Sawahlunto

The majority of the population of Sawahlunto City embraces Islam. Most of its adherents are Minangkabau people. Other religions practiced in this city are Christianity, Hinduism, and Confucianism, most of which are adhered to by non-Minangkabau residents. Various places of worship are also found in this city. Apart from being dominated by mosques, there are also two churches in Sawahlunto City, namely the Sawahlunto St. Parish Church. Barbara and HKBP Sawahlunto Church.

=== Ethnicity ===
The current population of the town of Sawahlunto is dominated by the Minangkabau and Javanese ethnic groups. Other ethnic groups who are also residents are Chinese and Batak. Since Sawahlunto was founded in the 19th century and was established as a coal mining town, the Dutch East Indies government began sending convicts from various prisons in Indonesia to Sawahlunto as forced laborers, around 20,000 convicts were shipped to Sawahlunto. This forced labor is known by the local community as Orang Rantai (Chained People).

== Mayors ==
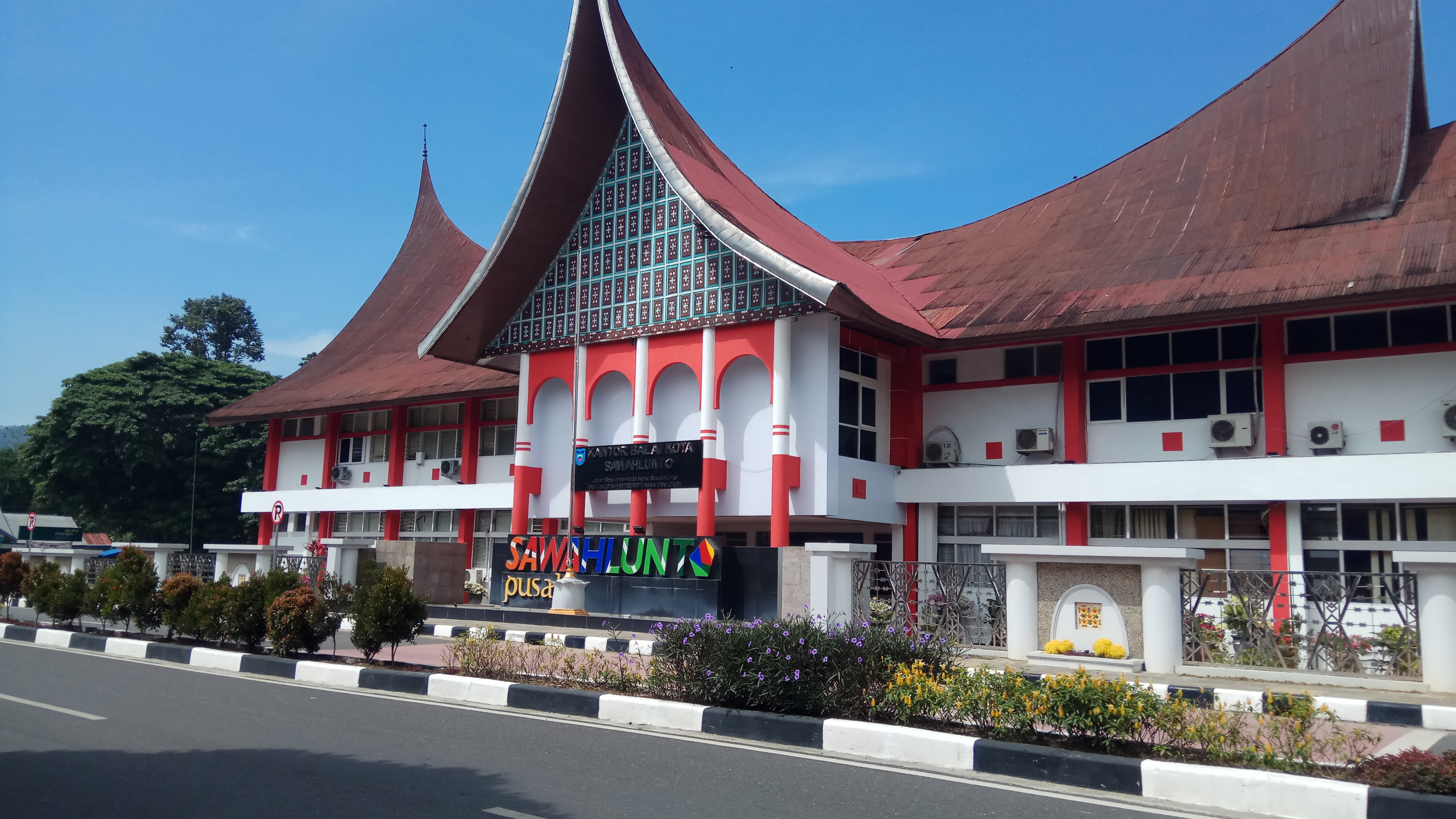
Sawahlunto city hall

Mayors who have led the town of Sawahlunto since its inauguration to date are as follows:

1. Achmad Nurdin, SH (Term of office 1965 s/d 1971)
2. Drs. Shaimoery, SH (Term of office 1971 s/d 1983)
3. Drs. Nuraflis Salam (Term of office 1983 s/d 1998)
4. Drs. H. Rahmatsjah (Term of office 1998 s/d 1993)
5. Drs. H. Subari Sukardi (Term of office 1993 s/d 1998 and Term of office 1998 s/d 2003)
6. Ir. H. Amran Nur (Term of office 2003 S/D 2008) and H. Fauzi Hasan (Term of office, representative 2003 S/D 2008)
7. Ir. H. Amran Nur (Term of office 2008 S/D 2013) and H. Erizal Ridwan, ST (Term of office, representative 2008 S/D 2013)
8. Ali Yusuf, S.Pt. (Term of office 2013 S/D 2018) and Ismed, S.H. (Term of office, representative 2013 S/D 2018)

== Recent developments ==
In 1990 the administration district of Sawahlunto was expanded from only 779ha to 27,344ha which brought about an increase in population. Based on the results of the Census survey conducted with the residents in 1995, the population in Sawahlunto was reflected to have increased to 55,090 people even though the land area of Sawahlunto remained the same unlike how towns would generally expand in proportion to the population growth. Due to its landscape, the expansion of Sawahlunto became a form of federation of small towns and rural settlements. However, based on the Census in 2000 the growth of its people was proven to be temporary, as the population of Sawahlunto appeared to be declining. Based on the same Census, it was stated that the total population was 50,668 people, which translates to a decline of 8% over 5 years. One of the reasons for this was that a portion of the employee housing of the Ombilin Coal Mining Unit (UPO) was shifted out of the town area of Sawahlunto. From this aspect, it can be inferred that Ombilin coal mining has a very strong influence on Sawahlunto.

Over 100 years, the amount of coal exploited has reached approximately 30 million tonnes with remaining reserves of more than 100 million tonnes. However, the future of the coal mining industry in Ombilin is now unclear due to reserves that can only be exploited internally. Whether or not these reserves will be exploited depends on the market price as well as market demand for coal and technological advancements. In addition, the implementation of coal mining is also facing a re-orientation due to its decentralised expansion. Regardless, the government and people of Sawahlunto are determined to make Sawahlunto a tourist destination with mining as an attraction. This reflects the new relationship between mining Ombilin and the town of Sawahlunto which can be further developed.

In recent years, the policy of the Sawahlunto municipal administration has been directed towards the twin goals of promoting structural adjustment in the local economy and tackling poverty. Structural adjustment measures have been implemented to transform the city from being a coal town to strengthening the tourist sector. To address poverty, the government has implemented a detailed poverty eradication program that focuses on agriculture, plantations, and the livestock sector. The measured level of poverty has fallen rapidly in recent years from over 17% in 2005 to under 3% in 2009.

The date of 1 December 1888 marked the inauguration of the town of Sawahlunto. The inauguration has been commemorated annually since 2005 with a traditional makan bajamba along the stretch of Pasar Remaja Kota Sawahlunto.

=== 2025 Sumatran Disaster ===
In late 2025, the city was significantly impacted by the 2025 Sumatra floods and landslides precipitated by Cyclone Senyar, which damaged regional infrastructure including the Sawahlunto-Teluk Bayur railway line. Consequently, the city's 137th anniversary celebrations in December were scaled back and reoriented toward humanitarian relief. Major annual events, including the Sawahlunto Derby at Kandih Racecourse, dedicated their revenues to aiding victims across West Sumatra.

== Tourism ==
The main tourist attraction in this city is the mining tourism attraction, where visitors can take a tour of the former mining areas that were built during the Dutch East Indies era.

=== Museum ===
As part of the historical relics, a public kitchen which previously could produce a large number of food for thousands of forced laborers and the train station where coal transportation activities were carried out were transformed into museums in 2005, they are Goedang Ransum Museum and Sawahlunto Railway Museum respectively. Meanwhile, a power plant building which was built in 1894, since 1952 has been used as a mosque under the name Masjid Agung Nurul Islam or known as the Great Mosque of Sawahlunto. The mosque has one large central dome surrounded by four smaller domes and a minaret that reaches 80 meters in height.

Coal mining activities in the city of Sawahlunto also left several other relics such as silos. These silos function as coal stockpiles that have been cleaned and ready to be transported to Teluk Bayur port. The silo is still standing in the middle of the city, even though it hasn't been used for a long period. In addition, the siren at the Silo still sounds every 07.00, 13.00 and 16.00 local time. During the Dutch East Indies period, the siren at the Silo indicated the working hours of the Orang Rantai, or convicts who were used as coal laborers.

Since 2017, the government has built three new museums, namely: the Sawahlunto Culture Museum, the Dance Museum, and the Museum of Wood Painting and Ethno.

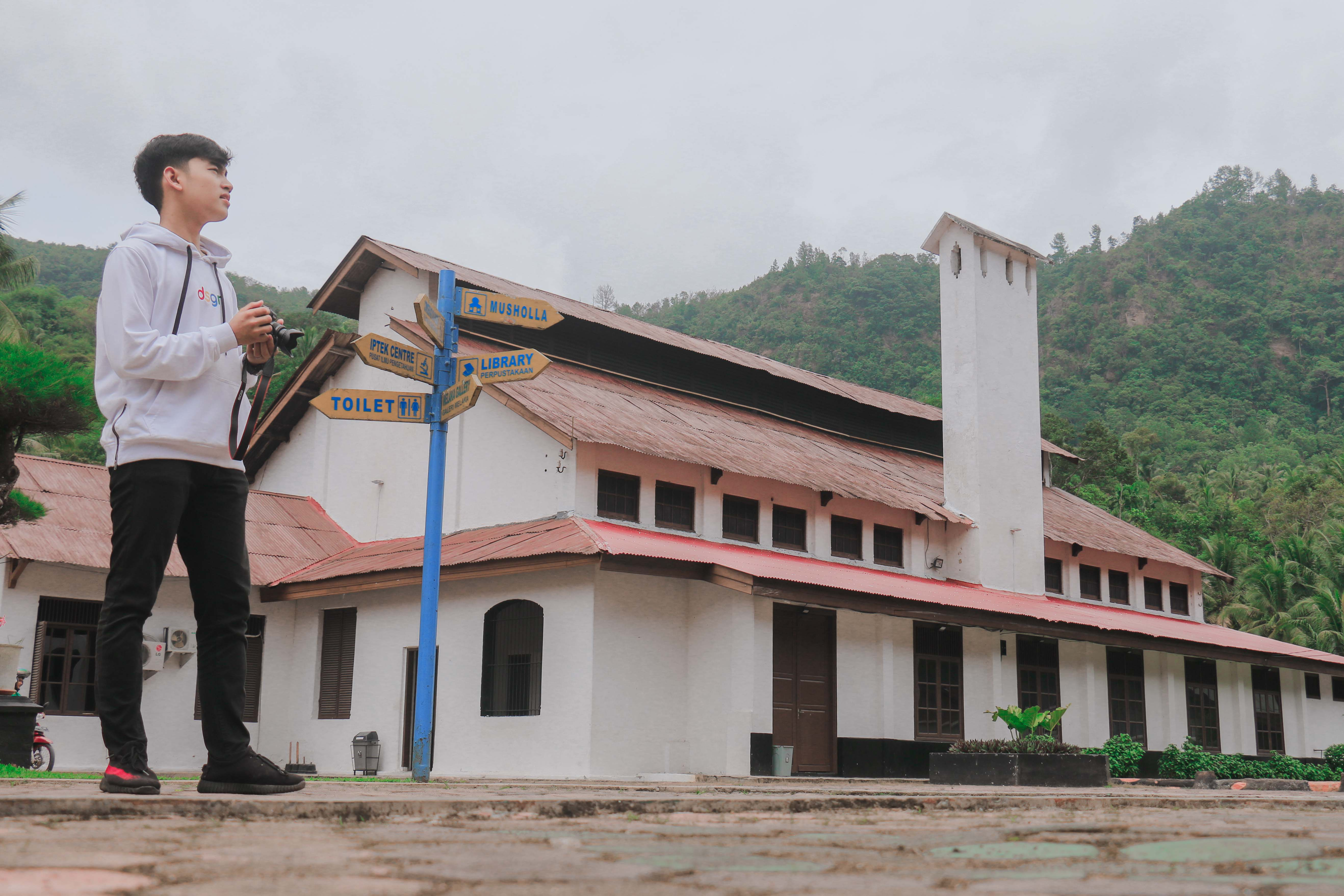
Goedang Ransoem Museum

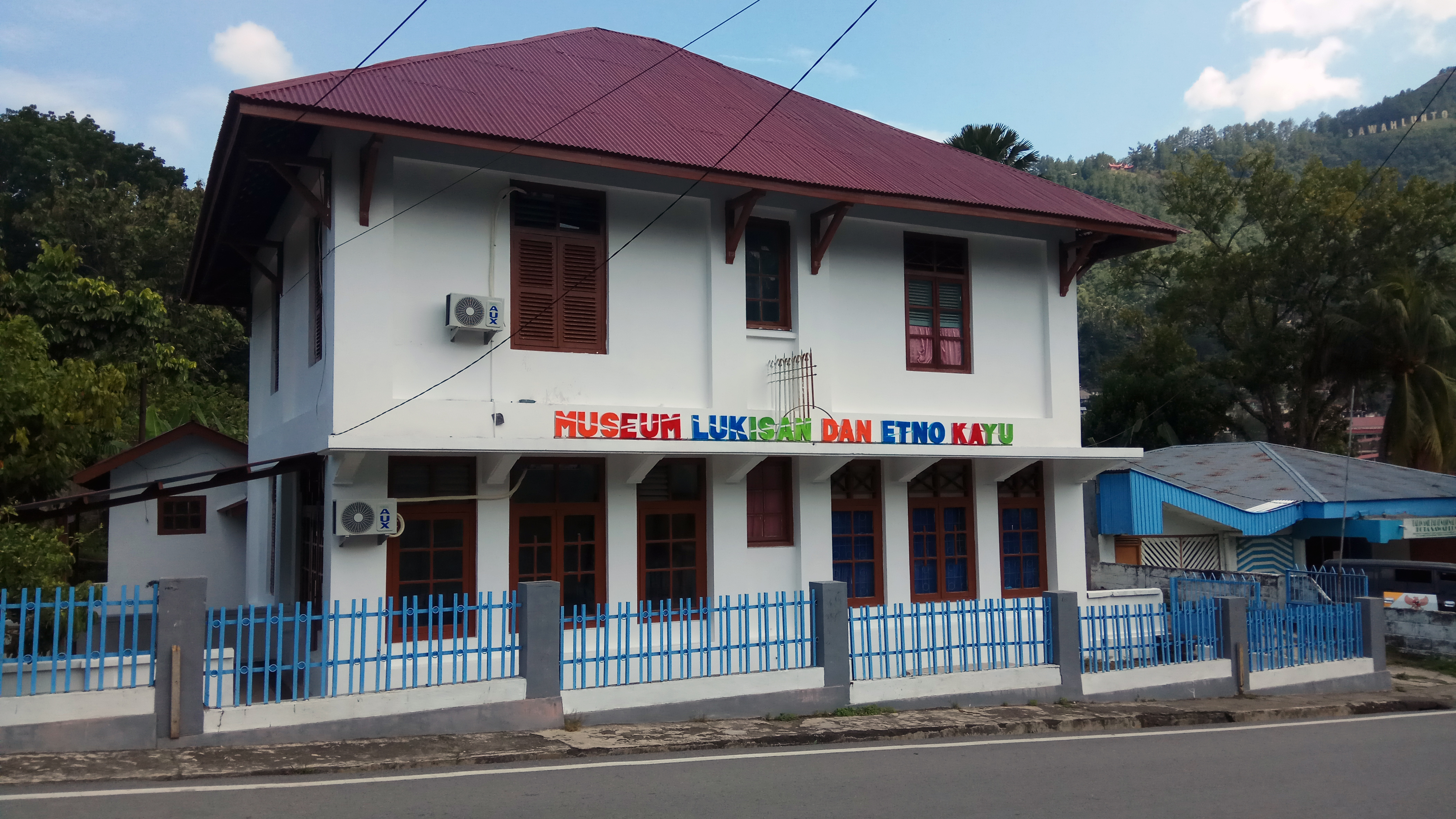
Museum of Wood Painting and Ethno

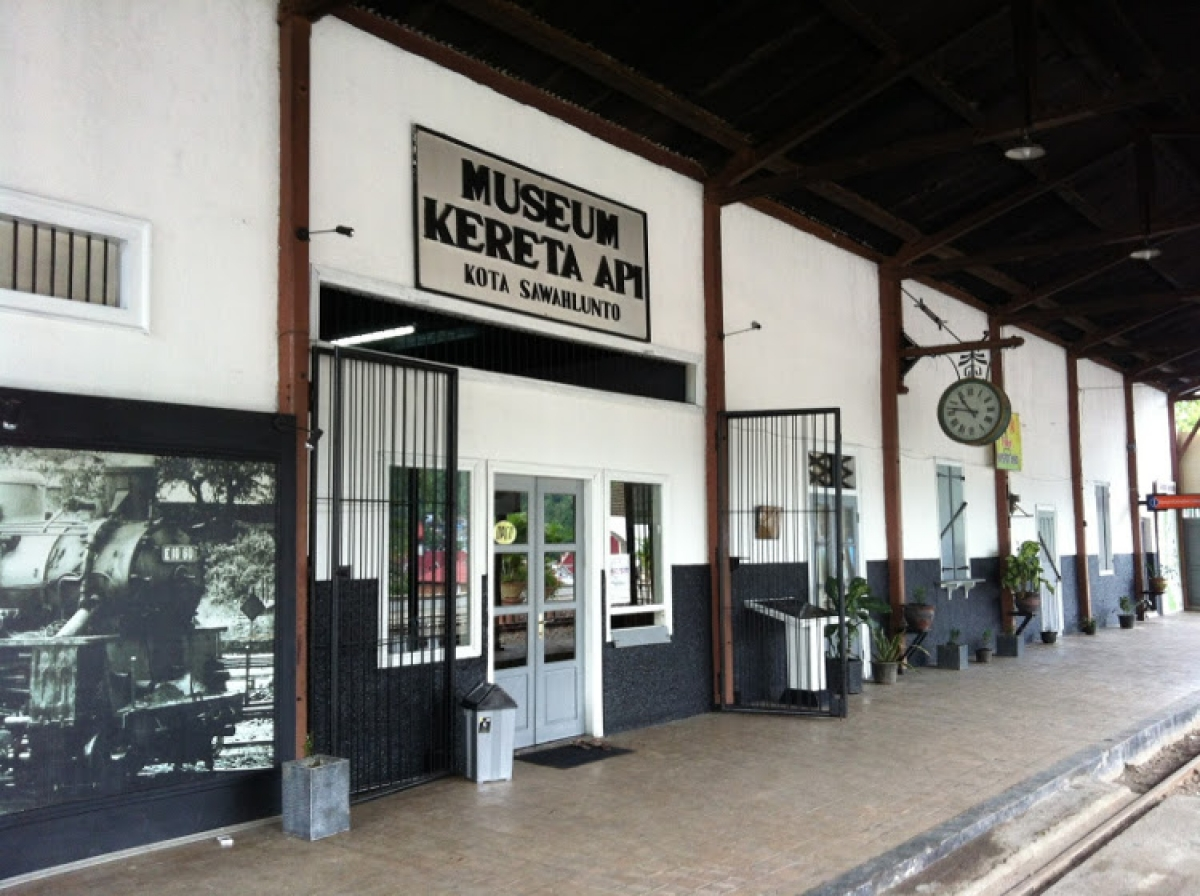
Sawahlunto Railway Museum

=== Architecture ===
Sawahlunto has numerous old Dutch heritage buildings. Some buildings have been designated by the local government as cultural heritage and tourist objects, one of which is the Sawahlunto Cultural Center Building (Gedung Pusat Kebudayaan Sawahlunto). Another building is PT Bukit Asam Unit Pertambangan Ombilin Office (formerly called Hoofdkantoor van de Steenkolenmijn Ombilin) which was built in 1916. The building has a tower in the center, and around it, there is a garden called the Triangle Park (Taman Segitiga).

Not far from Triangle Park is Lubang Suro, which is taken from the name of a forced labor foreman, Mbah Suro. Next to the Lubang Suro is the Info Box Building which was established to provide various information and documentation about the history of coal mining in the city of Sawahlunto.

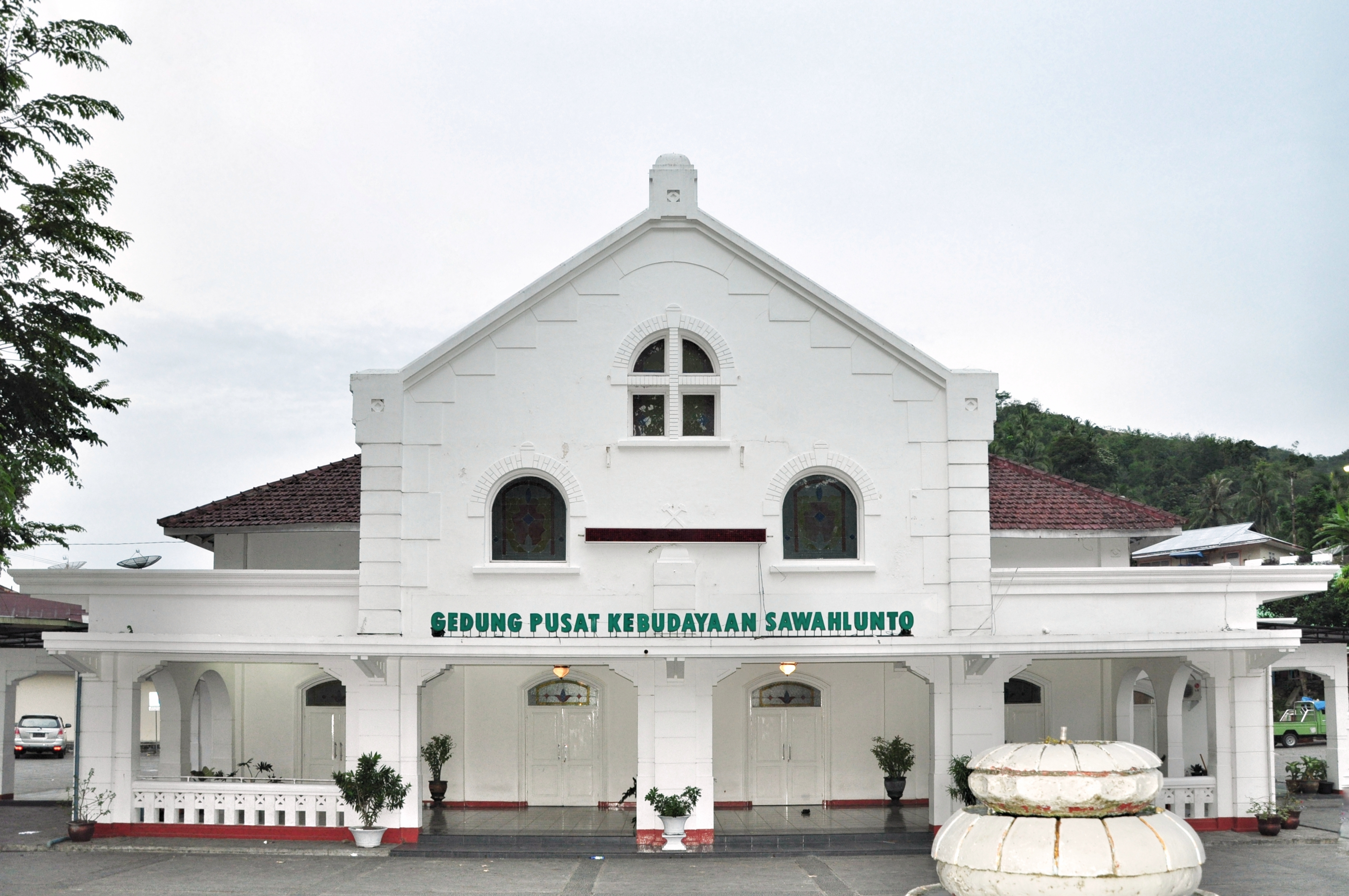
Sawahlunto Cultural Center Building (1910)

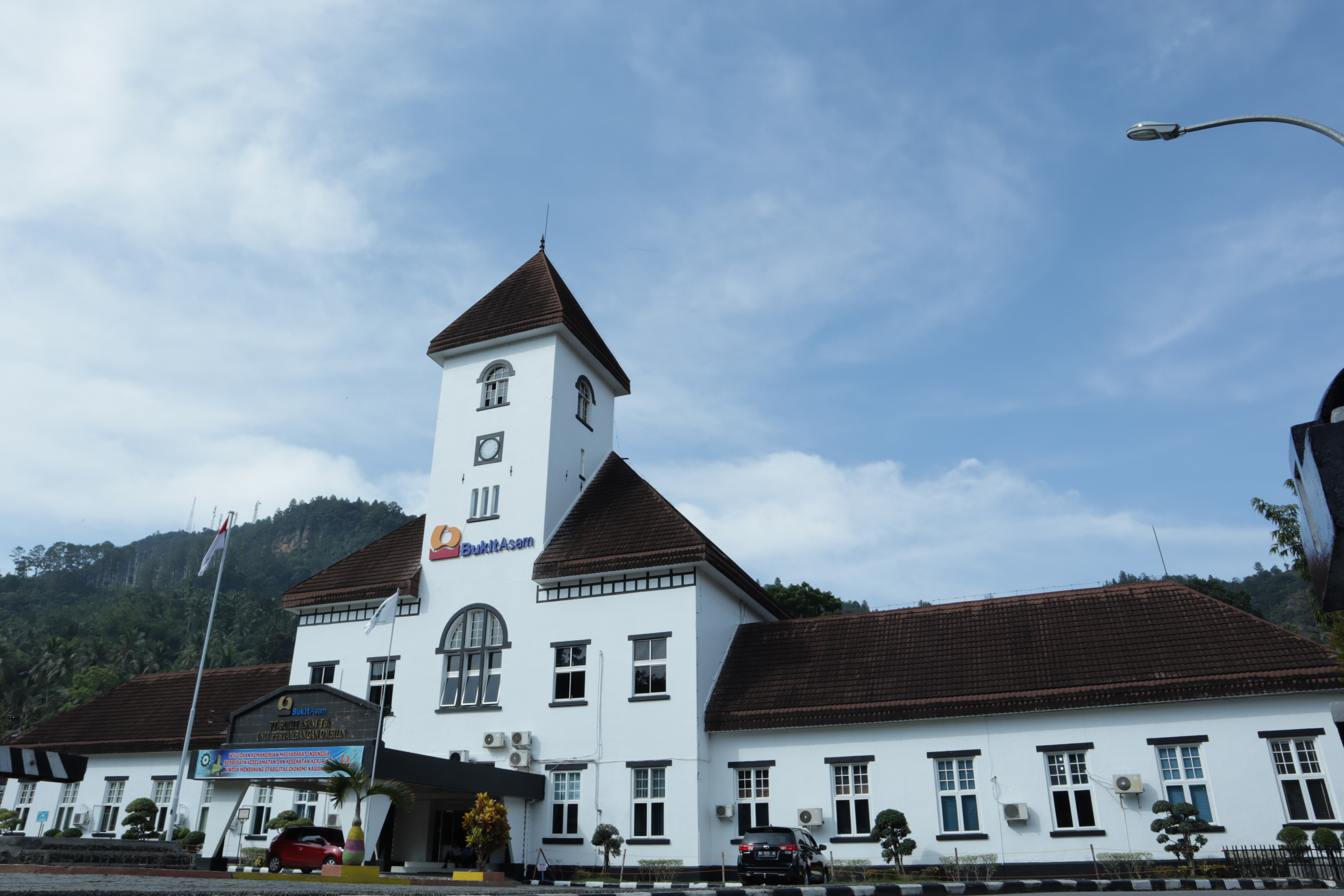
Bukit Asam Office Building (1916)

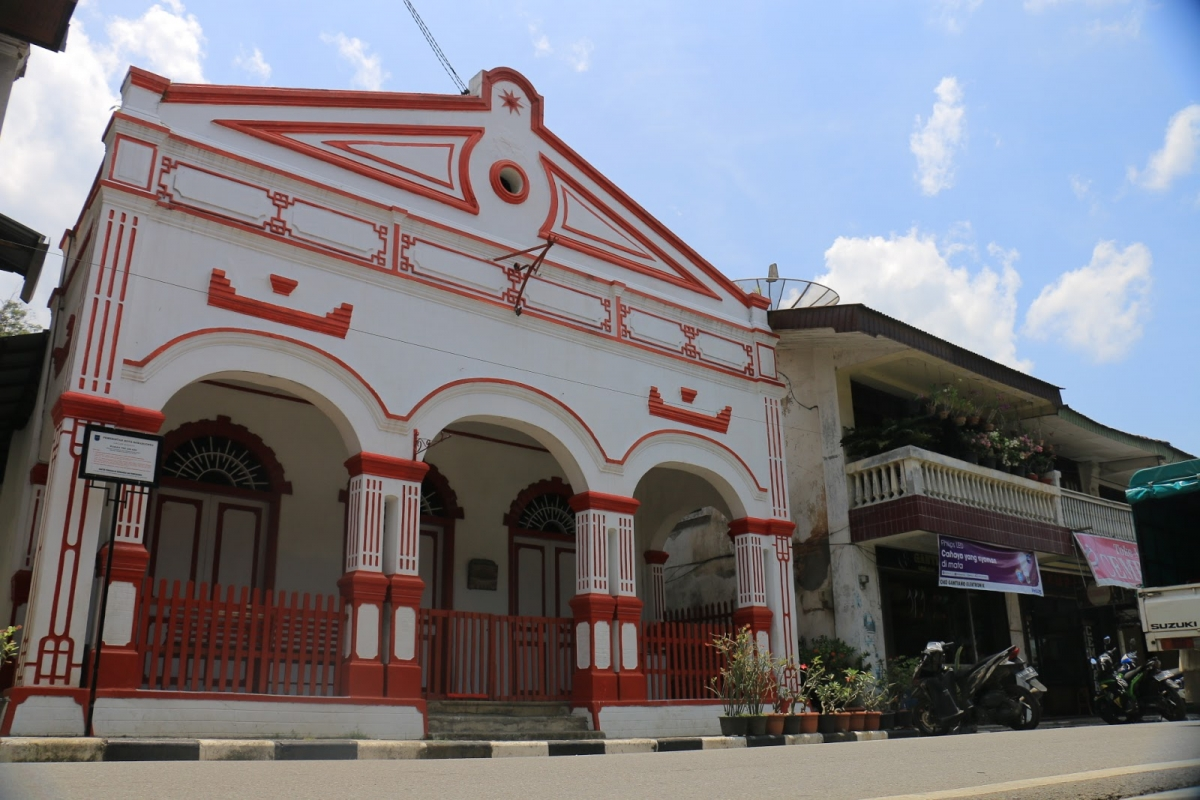
Pek Sing Kek House in New Indies style (1916)

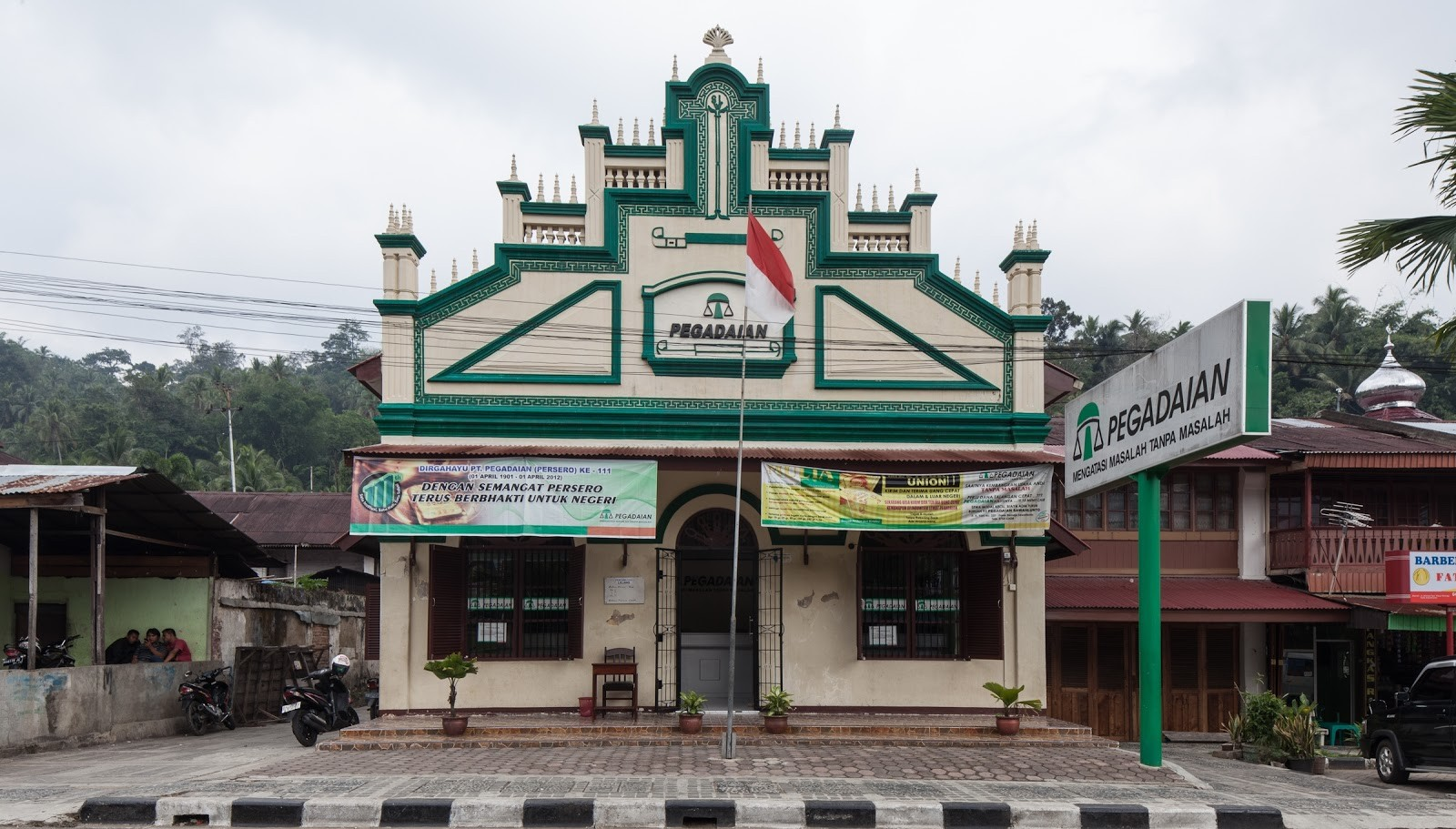
Sawahlunto Pegadaian Building (1917)

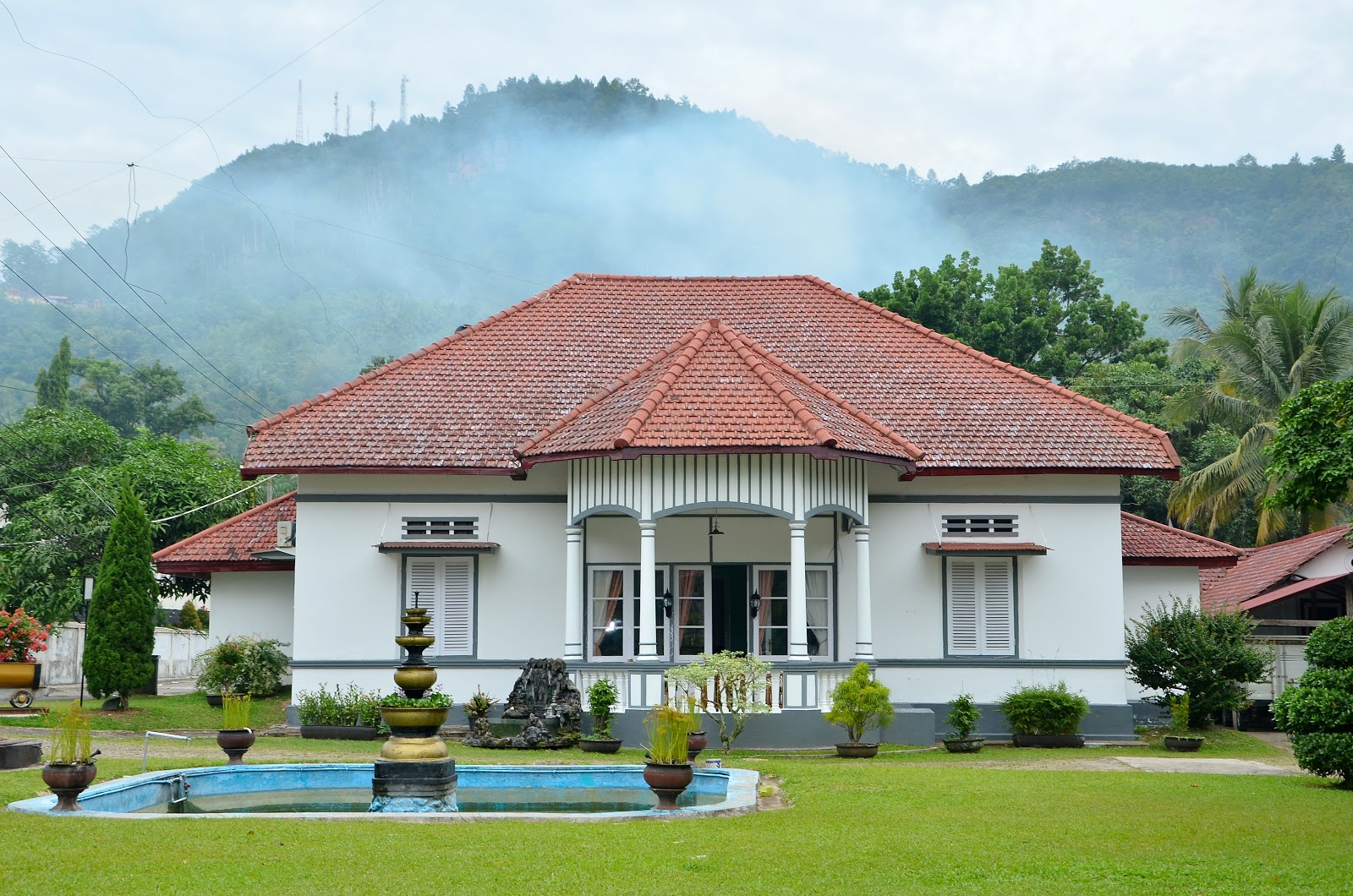
Wisma Ombilin landhuis (1918)

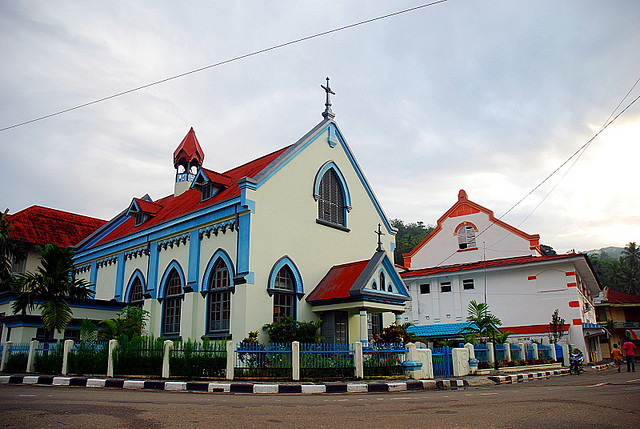
St. Barbara Church (1920)

=== Nature tourism ===
The city also has other tourist attractions such as a zoo which has an area of around 40 hectares and the Kandi Tourism Resort with an area of 393.4 hectares. There are 3 lakes formed from former coal mining excavations at the Kandi Tourism Resort, namely Kandi Lake, Tanah Hitam Lake, and Tandikek Lake. In addition, there is also a family recreation site known as Waterboom Sawahlunto.
